= Czech Americans =

Americans of Czech birth or descent

Czech Americans Čechoameričané
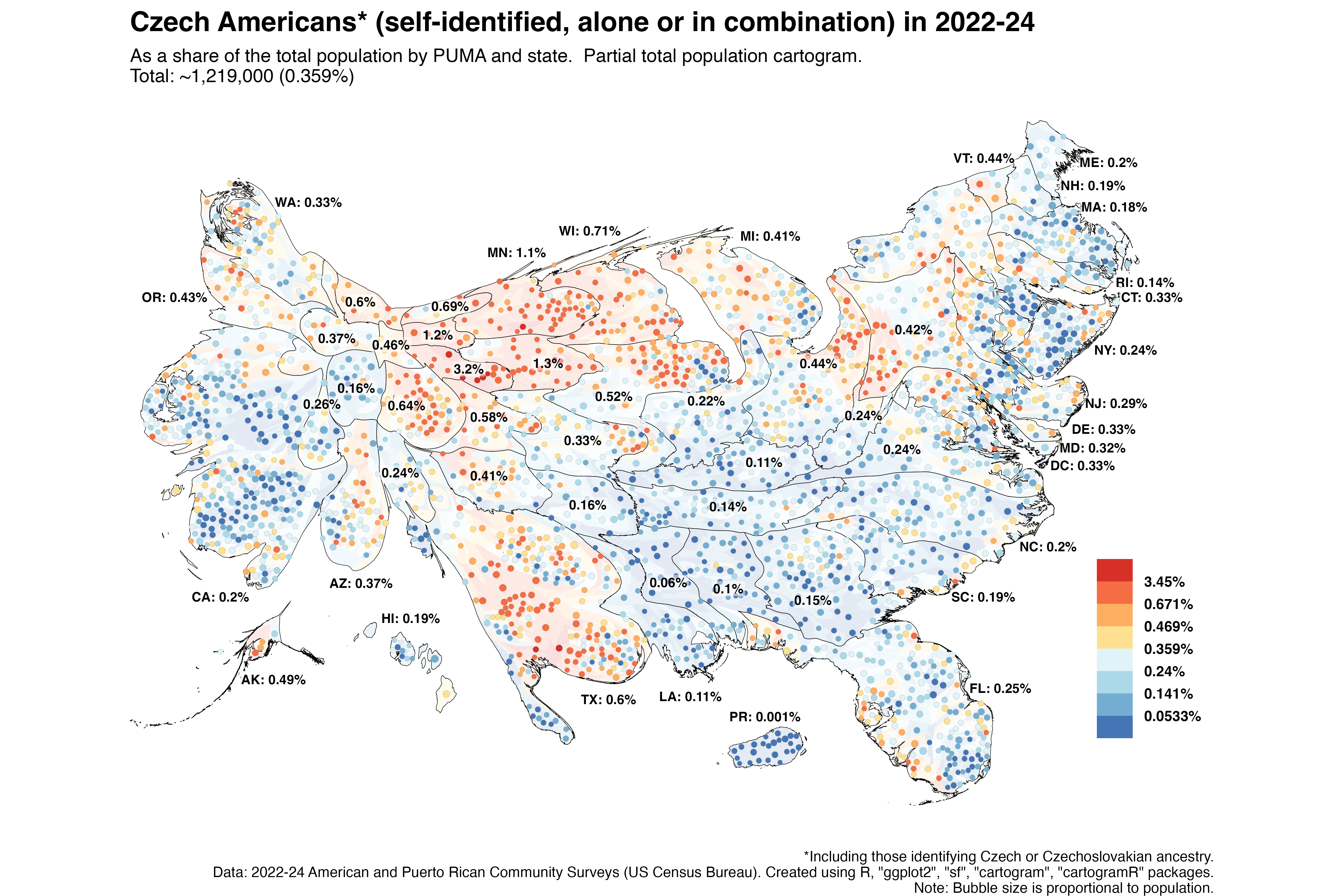

Total population
- 1,056,492 (2025); 0.3% of the US population

Regions with significant populations
- Texas, Nebraska, The Dakotas, Wisconsin, Iowa, Minnesota, Illinois, Michigan, Maryland, Ohio, New York Metropolitan Area, California, Florida, Oregon, Wisconsin

Languages
- American English, Czech

Religion
- Roman Catholicism, Protestantism, Judaism, irreligion

Related ethnic groups
- Other Czechs • Moravians • Czech Jews • Texan Silesians • Slovak Americans • Sorbian Americans • Austrian Americans • Polish Americans • Kashubian Americans

Number of Czech Americans
Year	Number
1980	1,892,456
1990	1,296,411
2000	1,262,527
2010	1,533,826

Czech Americans (Czech: Čechoameričané), known in the 19th and early 20th century as Bohemian Americans, are citizens of the United States whose ancestry wholly or partly originates from the Czech lands, a term which refers to the majority of the traditional lands of the Bohemian Crown, namely Bohemia, Moravia and Czech Silesia. These lands over time have been governed by a variety of states, including the Kingdom of Bohemia, the Austrian Empire, Czechoslovakia, and the Czech Republic, also known by its short-form name, Czechia. Germans from the Czech lands who emigrated to the United States are usually identified as German Americans, or, more specifically, as Americans of German Bohemian descent. According to the 2000 U.S. census, there are 1,262,527 Americans of full or partial Czech descent, in addition to 441,403 persons who list their ancestry as Czechoslovak.

== History ==
The first documented case of the entry of Czechs to the North American shores is of Joachim Gans of Prague, a Bohemian Jewish mining engineer who came to Roanoke, North Carolina in 1585 with an expedition of explorers organized by Sir Walter Raleigh (1552–1618).

Augustine Herman (1621–1686) was the first documented Czech settler. He was a surveyor and draftsman, successful planter and developer of new lands, a merchant, a politician and diplomat, fluent in several languages. After coming to New Amsterdam (present New York), he became one of the most influential people in the Dutch Province, which led to his appointment to the Council of Nine to advise the New Amsterdam Governor Peter Stuyvesant. One of his greatest achievements was his celebrated map of Maryland and Virginia commissioned by Lord Baltimore, which he began working on in earnest after removing to the English Province of Maryland. Lord Baltimore was so pleased with the map that he rewarded Herman with a large estate, named by Herman "Bohemia Manor", and the hereditary title Lord.

Another Bohemian living in New Amsterdam at that time, Frederick Philipse (1626–1720), also became quite famous. He was a successful merchant who eventually became the wealthiest person in the entire Dutch Province. Philipse was originally from Bohemia, from an aristocratic Protestant family who had to flee from their homeland due to popish persecution after the Thirty Years' War.

The first significant wave of Czech colonists was of the Moravian Brethren who began arriving on the American shores in the first half of the 18th century. Moravian Brethren were the followers of the teachings of the Czech religious reformer and martyr Jan Hus (1370–1415), Petr Chelčický and Bishop John Amos Comenius (1592–1670). They were true heirs of the ancient "Unitas fratrum bohemicorum" - Unity of the Brethren, who found a temporary refuge in Herrnhut (Czech: Ochranov) in Lusatia under the patronage of Count Nikolaus Zinzendorf (1700–1760). Because of the worsening political and religious situation in Saxony, the Moravian Brethren, as they began calling themselves, decided to emigrate to North America.

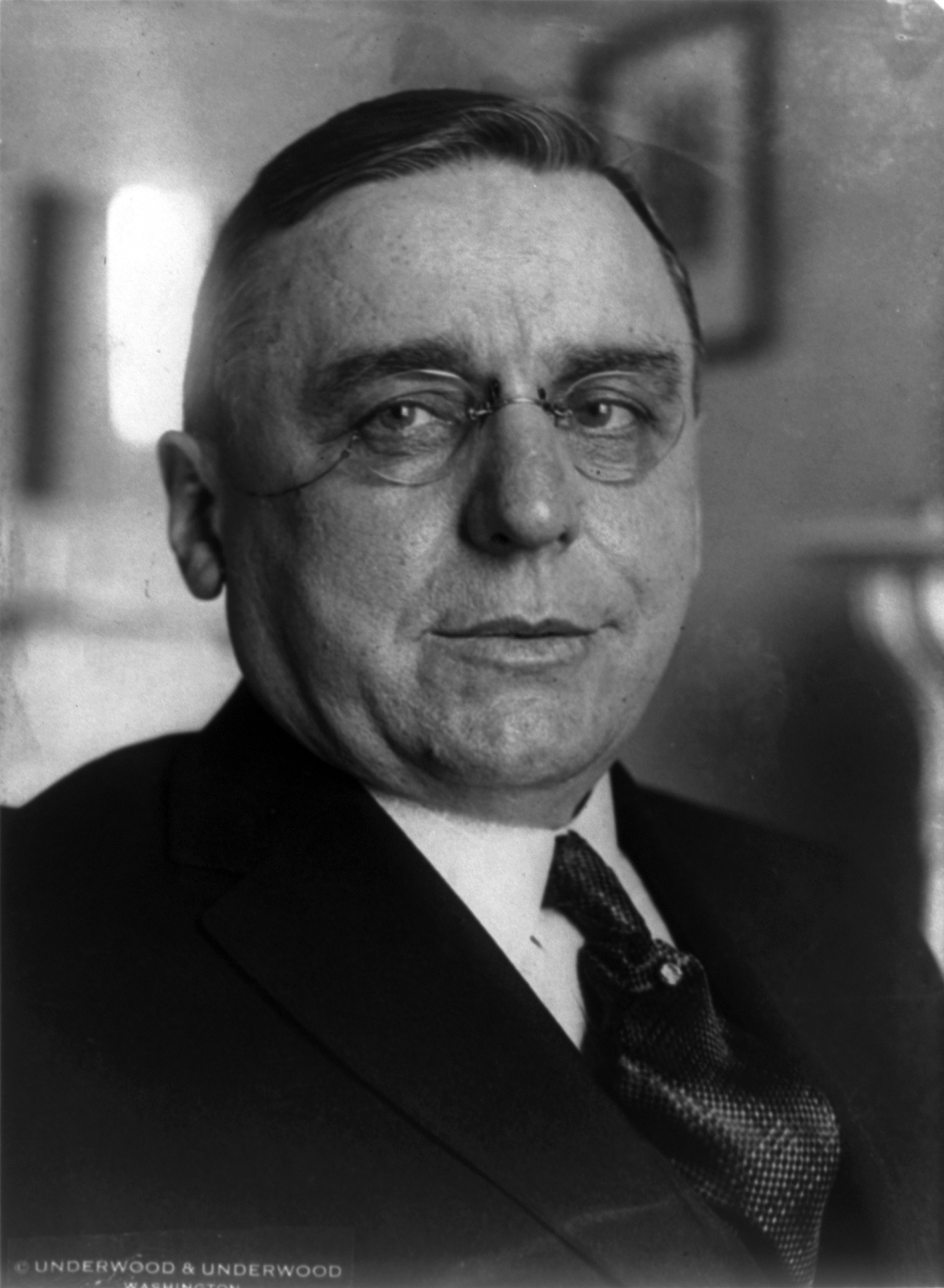
Chicago's Czech-born mayor Anton Cermak

This group started coming in 1735, when they first settled in Savannah, Georgia, and then in Pennsylvania, from which they spread to other states after the American Revolution, especially Ohio. The Moravians established a number of settlements, such as Bethlehem and Lititz in Pennsylvania and Salem in North Carolina. Moravians made great contributions to the growth and development of the United States. Cultural contributions of Moravian Brethren from the Czech lands were distinctly notable in the realm of music. The trumpets and horns used by the Moravians in Georgia are the first evidence of Moravian instrumental music in America.

In 1776, at the time of the Declaration of Independence, more than two thousand Moravian Brethren lived in the colonies. President Thomas Jefferson designated special lands to the missionaries to civilize the Indians and promote Christianity. The free uncultivated land in America encouraged immigration throughout the nineteenth century; most of the immigrants were farmers and settled in the Midwestern states. The first major immigration of Czechs occurred in 1848 when the Czech "Forty Eighters" fled to the United States to escape the political persecution by the Austrian Habsburgs. During the American Civil War, Czechs served in both the Confederate and Union army, but as with most immigrant groups, the majority fought for the Union.

Immigration resumed and reached a peak in 1907, when 13,554 Czechs entered the eastern ports. Unlike previous immigration, new immigrants were predominantly Catholic. Although some of the anticlericalism of the Czechs in Europe came to the United States, Czech Americans are, on the whole, much more likely to be practicing Catholics than Czechs in Europe.

By 1910, the Czech population was 349,000, and by 1940 it was 1,764,000. The U.S. Bureau of the Census reported that nearly 800,000 Czechs were residing in the U.S. in 1970. Since that figure did not include Czechs who had been living in the U.S. for several generations, it is reasonable to assume that the actual number was higher. Additionally, Czech immigrants in America often had different claims of origin in records. Before 1918, many Czechs would be listed as from Bohemia or Moravia or vaguely Austria or Silesia. Some were also counted as from Germany if they were German-speakers or rarely Polish if the recorder could not distinguish the language. Slovaks were often listed as from Hungary. After the formation of Czechoslovakia in 1918, Czechs and Slovaks were also listed under the new blanket category.

The Czech American community gained a high public profile in 1911, with the kidnapping and murder in Chicago of the five-year old Elsie Paroubek. The Czech American community mobilized massively to help in the searches for the girl and support her family, and it gained much sympathy from the general American public.

While most Czech-Americans are white, some are people of color or are Latino/Hispanic. A small group of Black Czech-Americans of Ethiopian descent lives in Baltimore. In Texas, many Tejanos have Czech ancestry. Czech immigrants to Texas had a deep influence on Tejano culture, particularly Tejano music.

=== Czechs in New York ===
For the majority of the 19th and 20th centuries, the Upper East Side of Manhattan was a middle-class neighborhood inhabited by Czech, Slovak, Irish, Polish, German and Hungarian immigrants. Czechs began to migrate in larger numbers in the second half of the 19th century, many of them being political refugees who emigrated after the wave of revolutions that swept through Europe in the year 1848.

Initially, they flocked to the Lower East Side, however due to the expansion of the German community, the Bohemians later started relocating together with the Hungarians to Yorkville.

By the end of the 19th century, a large number of Czechs and Slovaks had already settled on the Upper East Side, most of them between the 65th and 73rd Streets – the area known as Little Bohemia. In 1900, the New York Times stated that there were about 75,000 Bohemians residing in New York, with about 55,000 of them living on the east side of Manhattan. The East 72nd Street was even nicknamed the “Bohemian Broadway” because of all the Czechs who lived there. This area contained a lot of Czech shops, pubs, clubs and theatres.

A 1924 article named “New York City and the Czechs” argued that “No part of the city could as much resemble Prague as Fiftieth Street and thereabouts up to Seventieth Street”. The article goes on to describe that there are tunnels, and even streets, which one can reach only through stone stairs two stories high, and also speaks of cobblestone pavements and vaulted alleys.

Although most of the neighborhood's traces have since disappeared, many Czech institutions can still be found in the area, including a school established in 1867, a Czech Gymnastic Association and community center named Sokol and two churches.

== Population ==
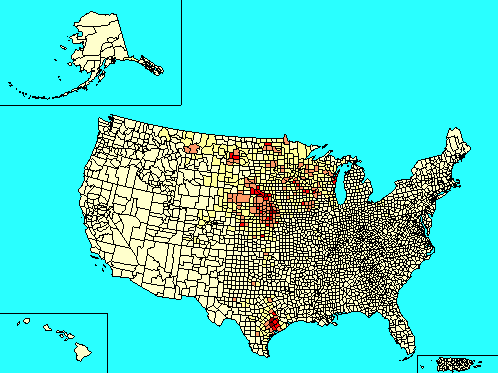
Distribution of Czech Americans according to the 2000 census.

=== The top 50 U.S. communities with the highest percentage of people claiming Czech ancestry ===
The top 50 U.S. communities with the highest percentage of people claiming Czech ancestry are:

1. Conway, ND 55.2%
2. West, TX 40.9%
3. Oak Creek, NE 38.2%
4. Wilber, NE 37.3%
5. Shiner, TX 32.1%
6. Montgomery, MN (township) 30.9%
7. Lonsdale, MN 30.5%
8. Wheatland, MN 29.9%
9. Tyndall, SD 29.5%
10. David City, NE 28.0%
11. Montgomery, MN (city) 26.3%
12. Franklin, WI 26.1%
13. Lanesburgh, MN 25.2%
14. Granger, TX 25.1%
15. Port Costa, CA 24.0%
16. Schulenburg, TX 23.7%
17. New Prague, MN and Erin, MN 23.5%
18. Wahoo, NE 22.7%
19. Carlton, WI 22.4%
20. Wallis, TX 22.0%
21. Hallettsville, TX 21.5%
22. Hale, MN 20.8%
23. Montpelier, WI 19.7%
24. Flatonia, TX 19.5%
25. West Kewaunee, WI 19.2%
26. Schuyler, NE and Webster, NE 19.0%
27. Gibson, WI 18.9%
28. Hillsboro, WI 18.4%
29. Kossuth, WI 18.2%
30. Lexington, MN 18.1%
31. Mishicot, WI 16.9%
32. Kewaunee, WI and North Bend, NE 16.7%
33. Franklin, WI 15.9%
34. Oak Grove, WI and Caldwell, TX 15.7%
35. Lake Mary, MN 15.4%
36. Solon, IA 15.2%
37. Mishicot, WI 15.0%
38. Helena, MN 14.9%
39. Marietta, NE 14.7%
40. Stickney, IL 14.5%
41. Ord, NE (township) and Weimar, TX 14.3%
42. Crete, NE 14.2%
43. Park River, ND 14.1%
44. Ord, NE (city) and La Grange, TX 14.0%
45. Wagner, SD 13.6%
46. Needville, TX 13.2%
47. Calmar, IA and Worcester, WI 13.0%
48. Webster, MN 12.9%
49. North Riverside, IL 12.4%
50. Belle Plaine, IA 12.3%

=== U.S. communities with the most residents born in the Czech Republic (former Czechoslovakia) ===
The top U.S. communities with the most residents born in the Czech Republic (former Czechoslovakia) are:

1. Masaryktown, FL 3.1%
2. Mifflinville, PA 2.2%
3. Gulf Shores, AL 2.1%
4. North Riverside, IL and Sharon Springs, NY 2.0%
5. Lyons, IL 1.6%
6. Rose, WI, North Lynbrook, NY and Anna Maria, FL 1.5%
7. Oakbrook Terrace, IL and Danville, AR 1.4%
8. Bee Ridge, FL, Cameron, TX, Lenox, MA, Verdigre, NE, and Willowbrook, IL 1.2%
9. Lower Grand Lagoon, FL, Beachwood, OH, Allamuchy-Panther Valley, NJ, Mahopac, NY, Black Diamond, FL, and Glenview, KY 1.1%
10. Key West, FL, Woodstock, NY, Madison Park, NJ, Belleair Beach, FL, South Amboy, NJ, Colver, PA, Herricks, NY, Horine, MO, Shelburne, MA, and Gang Mills, NY 1.0%

=== The states with the largest Czech American populations ===
The states with the largest Czech American populations are:

Texas	155,855
Illinois	123,708
Wisconsin	97,220
Minnesota	85,056
Nebraska	83,462
California	77,673
Ohio	70,009
Iowa	51,508
New York	44,942
Florida	42,890
Vermont	38,000

However, these figures are grossly understated when second and third generation descendants are included.

=== The states with the top percentages of Czech Americans ===
The states with the top percentages of Czech Americans are:

Nebraska	5.5%
South Dakota	2.3%
North Dakota	2.2%
Wisconsin	2.1%
Iowa	2.1%
Minnesota	2.1%
Illinois	1.2%
Montana	1.0%
Wyoming	1.0%

== Festivals ==
Many cities in the United States hold festivals celebrating Czech culture and cuisine.

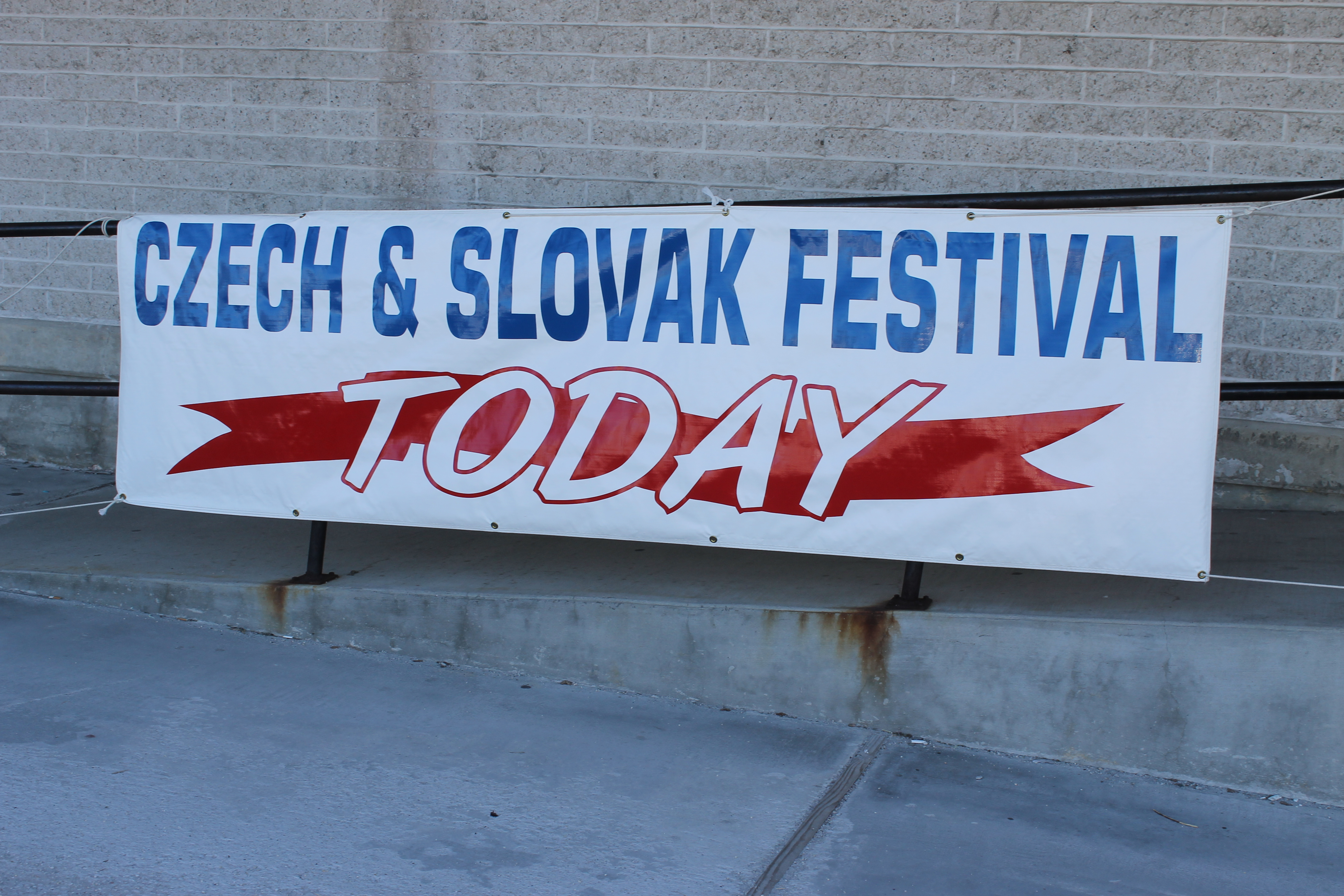
Czech and Slovak Heritage Festival in Parkville, Maryland, October 2014.

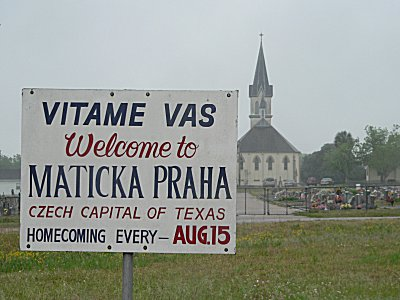
Welcome to Praha, Texas, "Czech Capital of Texas".

- Iowa
  - Cedar Rapids, Iowa - Saint Ludmila's Church - June
  - Protivin, Iowa - Czech Days. August
- Kansas
  - Wilson, Kansas - Czech Festival, last weekend in July.
- Maryland
  - Parkville, Maryland - Czech and Slovak Heritage Festival. Started in 1987 to celebrate Baltimore's Czech and Slovak heritage.
- Minnesota
  - Bechyn, Minnesota - Czechfest. 2nd Sunday in August.
  - Montgomery, Minnesota
    - Kolacky Days. 4th full weekend in July. Started in 1929.
    - Masopust. Sunday prior to Ash Wednesday
    - Miss Czech Slovak Minnesota Pageant - April
  - New Prague, Minnesota - Dozinky Festival - September
  - St. Paul, Minnesota - Czech and Slovak Festival - September
- Nebraska
  - Wilber, Nebraska - Wilber Czech Days
  - Verdigre, Nebraska - Kolach Days
  - Clarkson, Nebraska - Clarkson Czech Days
- Oklahoma
  - Prague, Oklahoma - Kolache Festival, First Saturday in May
  - Yukon, Oklahoma - Yukon Czech Festival, 1st Saturday in October
- Ohio
  - DTJ Taborville in Auburn Township, Geauga County, Ohio
    - Cesky Den (Czech Day), 2nd Sunday in July, since 1923
    - Obzinky, 2nd Sunday in August, since 1934
- South Dakota
  - Tabor, South Dakota - Czech Days, third Friday and Saturday in June - www.taborczechdays.com
- Texas
  - Ennis, Texas - National Polka Festival
  - Weimar
  - Hallettsville 4th weekend in March and last Saturday of September
  - Shiner Several lesser Czech and Kolache festivals are held in Shiner varying in size, occasion and date, where Shiner's largest contribution to Kolache festivities conjoins with the Hallettsville Kolache Festival and the annual Bocktober festival.
  - Yoakum 2nd week of June as part of the annual Tom-Tom Festival
  - Missouri City
  - Corpus Christi 3rd Saturday in March
  - Houston 4th Sunday in March and 3rd Sunday in May
  - Rosenberg First full weekend in May
  - Ennis Memorial Day Weekend
  - San Antonio First weekend in June and Last Sunday in October
  - East Bernard Second Saturday in June
  - Ammannsville Father's Day
  - Dubina First Sunday in July
  - Praha August 15
  - Flatonia Czilispiel during the last full weekend in October
  - Marak Last Sunday in August
  - West Labor Day Weekend
  - Caldwell Second Saturday in September
  - Pasadena 4th weekend in October
  - Crosby Annual Czech Fest is held the first Saturday in October. Sacred Heart Catholic Church in Crosby is the festivals organizer and was the original site of the festival. However, as the festival and Crosby have grown it has been held at the Crosby Fair and Rodeo grounds since about 1990.
  - Temple
  - Libuse Annual celebration held by the Louisiana Czech Heritage Association. Includes attractions such as Czech cuisine, Czech dancers, and a showing of the history of the Czech community in Libuse, Louisiana.
- Wisconsin
  - Hillsboro, Wisconsin - Český den, second full weekend in June. Started in 1983.
  - Kewaunee, Wisconsin - Czech & Kolache Festival, the 1st full weekend in August at the beautiful Heritage Farm.
  - Phillips, Wisconsin - Czech-Slovak Festival and Lidice & Ležáky Villages Memorial Service, 3rd full weekend in June. Started in 1988.

== See also ==
- Czech Brazilians
- Czech Canadians
- Czech Texans
- Czech South Dakotans
- Czech Nebraskans
- European Americans
- Demographics of the Czech Republic
- Czech Republic–United States relations
