= Klobásník =

American Czech savory food

Klobasnek
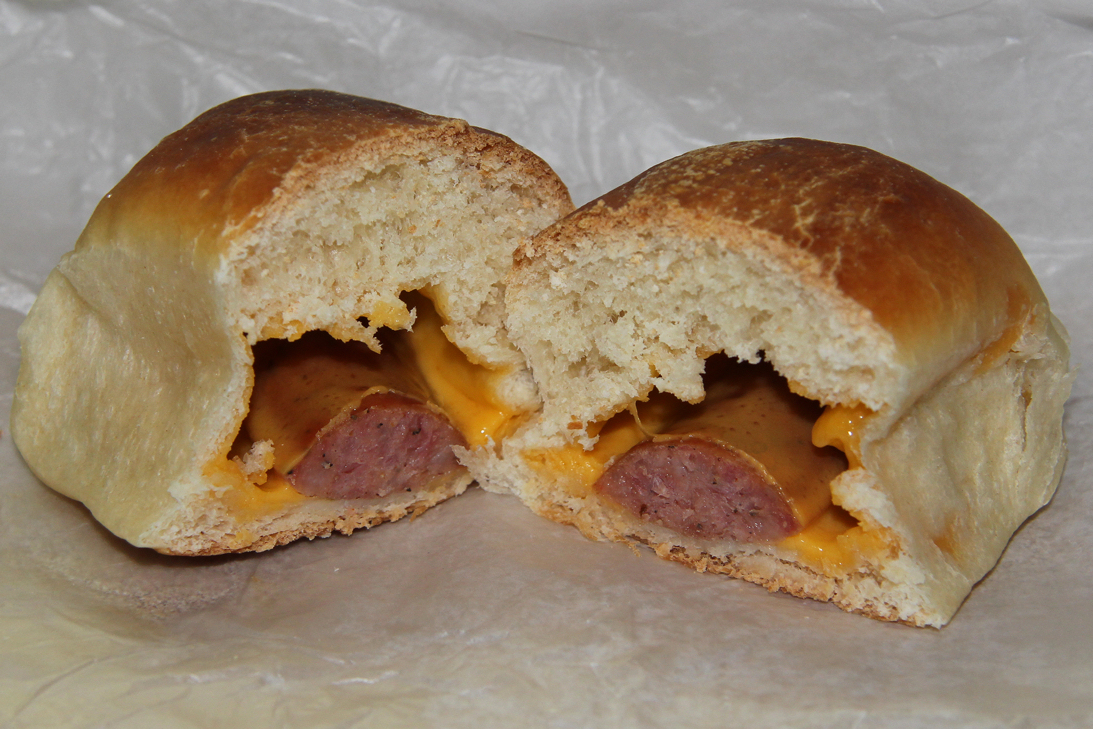
- A traditional sausage klobásník with cheese added
- Type: Baked goods
- Place of origin: United States
- Region or state: Texas

A klobasnek (/ˌkloʊˈbæsnɪk/, Czech klobásník, Czech plural klobásníky) is a chiefly American Czech savory finger food. Klobasneks are much more commonly known as kolaches in Texas, but should not be confused with traditional Czech kolaches, which are also popular and are known by the same name. Klobasneks are similar in style to sausage rolls, but the meat is wrapped in kolache dough. Klobasneks have become a significant element of Texan culture and can be found everywhere from gas stations to specialized kolache shops throughout the state, even outside areas with large Czech Texan populations.

Unlike traditional kolaches, which came to the United States with Moravian immigrants, klobasneks were first made by Czechs who settled in Texas.

Traditionally klobasneks are filled with klobása sausage, but as their popularity has increased in the United States, other ingredients, such as ham, eggs, cheese and peppers, are used alongside or instead of sausage. Hot dog has become a common filling. In Texas, a number of regionally unique and culturally syncretic filling ingredients include the Cajun pork and rice sausage called boudin.

In Texas, klobasnek are often called kolaches by people not of Czech origin whereas Texans of Czech ancestry refer to the savory pastries as klobasneks.

== See also ==
- Czech Texans
- Klobása
- Bierock
- Sausage roll
- Pepperoni roll
- Kolach (cake)
- Czech Stop and Little Czech Bakery
- List of hot dogs
- List of pastries
- List of sausage dishes
- List of stuffed dishes
