= Czech Stop and Little Czech Bakery =

Bakery in West, Texas, US

Coordinates: 31°48′12″N 97°05′58″W

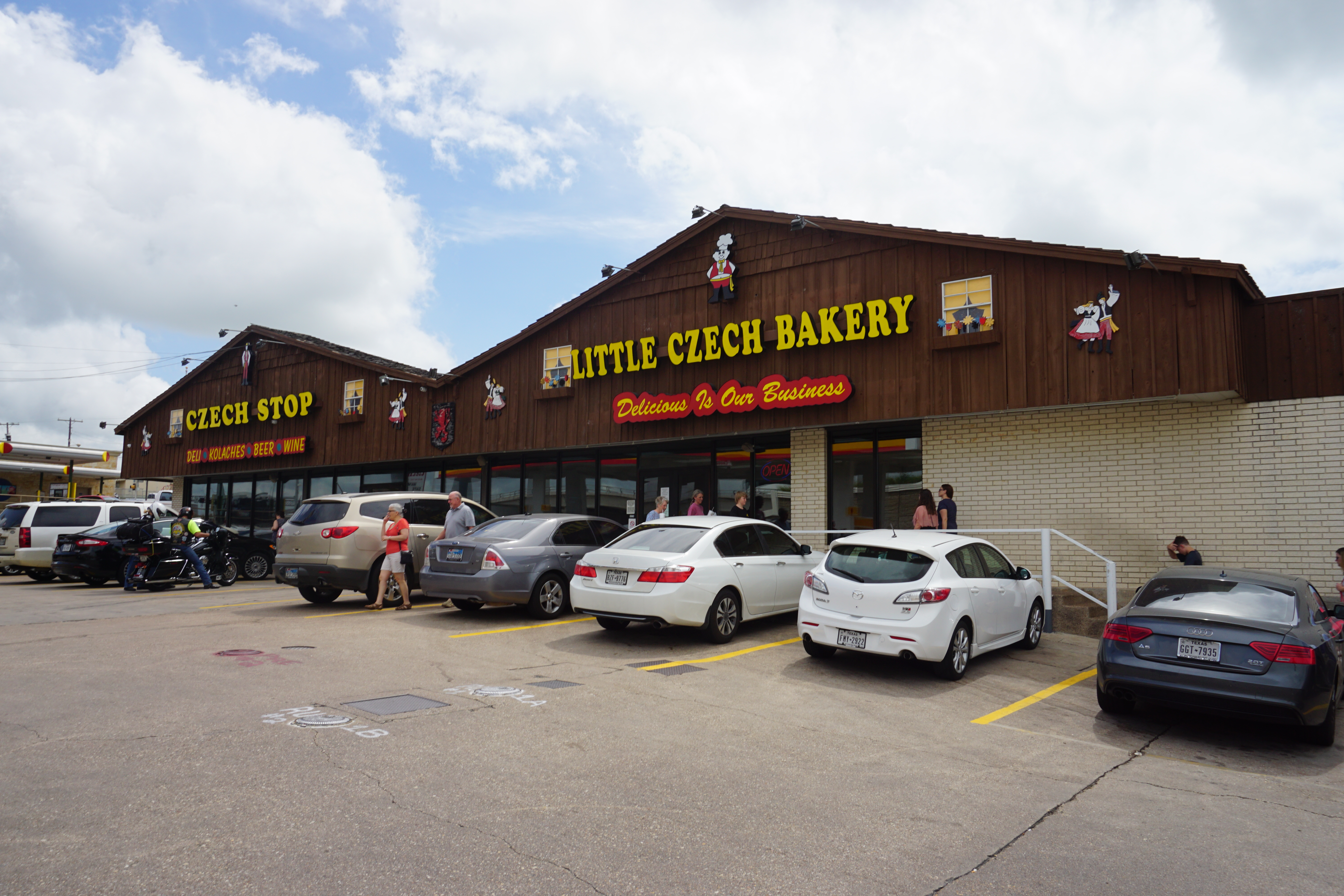
- Czech Stop on left, and Little Czech Bakery on right
- Interactive map of Czech Stop and Little Czech Bakery

Restaurant information
- Established: November 1983
- Food type: Czech Texan
- Location: P.O. Box 476, 105 N. College Street (Interstate 35, Exit 353), West, Texas, 76691, United States
- Website: Official website

The Czech Stop and Little Czech Bakery is a combination deli/bakery and convenience store located in the city of West, Texas.

Established in 1983, the store serves traditional Czech cuisine such as kolache, klobasnek and strudels. The city is notable for its Czech heritage and was designated as the "Home of the official Kolache of the Texas Legislature". The store serves around 600 people a day and is a popular stop for travelers along Interstate 35.

According to a poster in the store, the Czech Stop uses over 1,200 lbs of cream cheese, 9,000 lbs of flour, 750 gallons of milk, 2,400 lbs of butter 1,300 lbs of sausage, 2,100 dozen eggs, and 2,500 lbs of American cheese each week to produce its baked goods.

The Czech Stop remained open after the West Fertilizer Company explosion on April 17, 2013, to serve local residents and first responders.

The store has been featured in Southern Living, Primetime: What Would You Do? on ABC, and on The Oprah Winfrey Show.
