= Czech Texans =

Texas residents of Czech ancestry

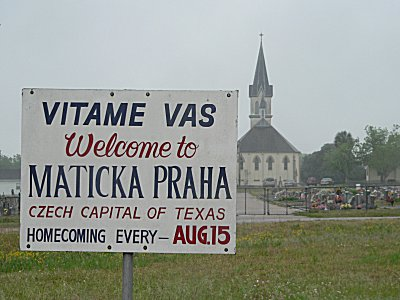
Welcome to Praha, Texas, "Czech Capital of Texas"

Czech Texans (Czech: Texaňané), often informally called Czexans, are residents of the state of Texas who are of Czech ancestry. Large-scale Czech immigration to Texas began after the Revolutions of 1848 changed the political climate in Central Europe, and after a brief interruption during the U.S. Civil War, continued until the First World War. Concentrated in Central Texas, Czech Texans have preserved their identity through the Czexan style of music, the Painted Churches of Texas, regular Czech dances and festivals, bakeries specializing in Czech pastries, and Czech and Czexan fusion cuisine.

As of the 2020 United States census, there are 193,058 Czech-Americans living in Texas, the largest number of any state.

== History ==
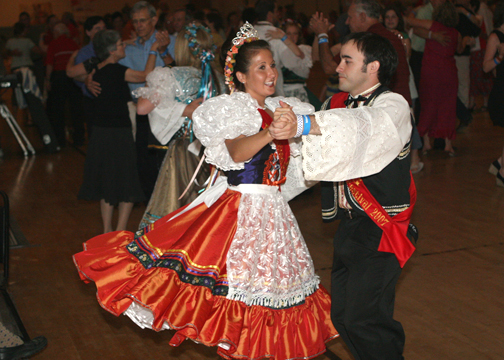
Dancers at the National Polka Festival in Ennis, TX

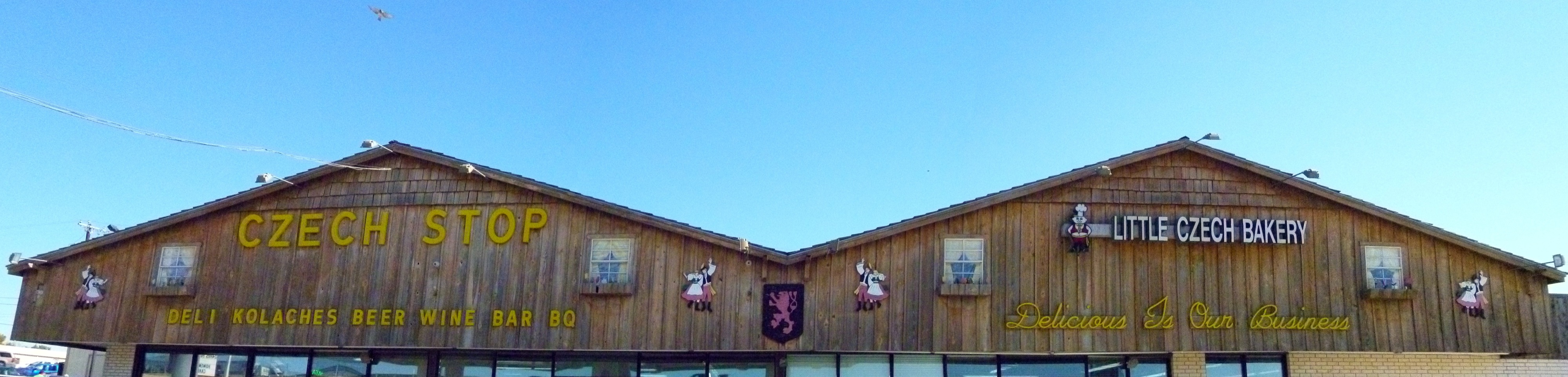
Czech Stop and Little Czech Bakery

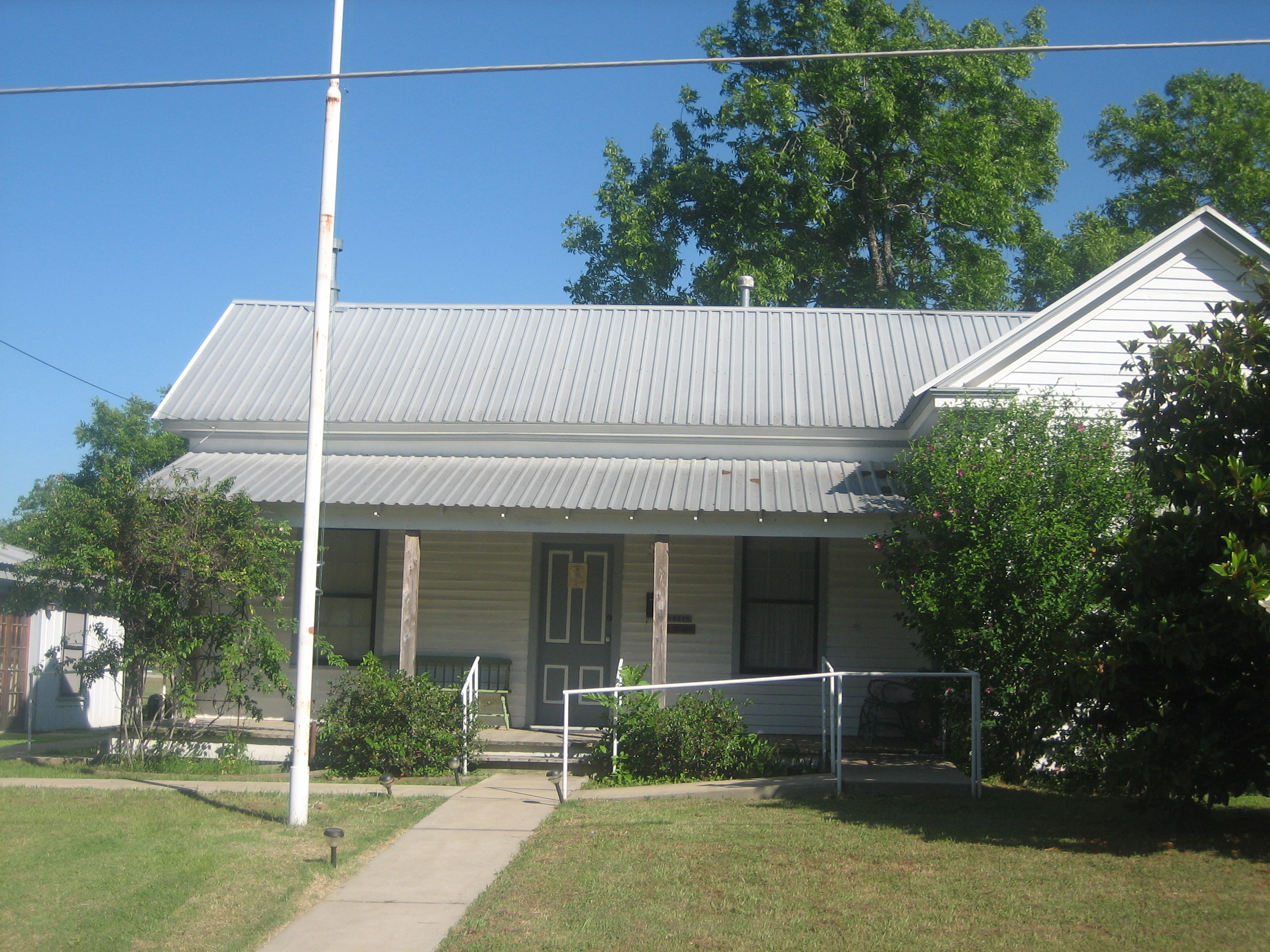
Czech Museum in Caldwell

Historically, Czech Moravian settlements were founded in Central Texas. "Czechs first settled in Texas in the 1840s, traveling from Bohemia, Moravia, and Austrian Silesia ... Czech settlers usually identified themselves as Austrian, German, Bohemian, Slovak or Moravian."

Czech immigration to Texas began as early as the 1820s, but most immigrants made the journey as individuals. Large-scale and family immigration began with the immigration of Rev. Josef Arnost Bergmann, described as the "father" of Czech immigration to Texas by some sources, and his family in 1850. Once settled in Texas, Bergmann wrote letters to families in Europe, encouraging them to come to Texas.

Czech immigration was driven by the availability of land in Texas and by events in Europe. In the 1840s, the Austrian Empire, which included Czech lands, was still run by a feudal system, despite the wave of democratic ideals permeating western Europe. This led to the Revolutions of 1848, which did little to improve the economic status of peasants who still found it difficult to gain wealth. The revolutions, together with factors such as religious persecution and mandatory military service, fueled a wave of emigration from Austria beginning in 1852. Immigrants to America were unfamiliar with the concept of American democracy due to their lack of experience with democratic ideals. The concepts of states' rights and slavery were equally foreign to the immigrants.

Josef Lidumil Lesikar (1806-1887) was instrumental in organizing two groups of about 160 Czechs to immigrate to Texas in 1851 and 1853. Although about half of the first group died, Lesikar, his wife, and their four sons reached Galveston with the second group on board the Suwa in late December 1853. The family bought farmland in New Bremen, Austin County. The men felled trees and built a log house that still stands, with a Texas historical marker before it. Lesikar wrote articles for periodicals published in various parts of the United States as well as in his native land, and his writings encouraged many Czechs to come to America. As one of the founders of Národní noviny, a Czech newspaper published in St. Louis, he helped to lay the foundation for Czech journalism in America. In his writing he opposed secession. He died on October 21, 1887, near New Ulm and is buried in the New Ulm Cemetery.

In January 1861, as tensions between northern and southern states over slavery reached a breaking point, a convention was called in Austin to draft a secession document, which was then approved by a vote of the citizens in February. The recency of the Czech immigration meant that most Czechs living in Texas were not naturalized citizens, and were therefore unable to vote in the decision for secession. Texas became a member of the Confederacy in March 1861, and in April 1861, the first battle of the Civil War took place at Fort Sumter, South Carolina. In July 1861, a Union blockade of the Southern coast reached Texas and stopped all immigration, Czech or otherwise. By the time of the blockade, the Czech population in Texas had grown from 74 in 1852 to over 700.

In 1861, as the war was beginning, more than 600 men in Fayette County and 160 men in Austin County volunteered for either active duty or military reserve service. Of those enrolled, only nine in Fayette County and zero in Austin County were definitively Czech. This changed in 1862, when conscription laws for military service were established and enforced. Under the Confederate Constitution, military service was a legal method of obtaining Confederate citizenship for those who were not formerly American citizens, but aliens, unlike citizens, were not required to serve in the regular military. The exemptions for aliens were determined by the Confederate War Department to apply only to aliens who were not permanent settlers and had not renounced their native allegiance. This did not apply to the majority of Czechs because they were permanent settlers. As a result, Czechs were conscripted to serve in the Confederate Army. To avoid conscription, some chose to leave Texas and join the Union Army; others went into hiding. For many Czechs, an alternative to conscription was to carry cotton to Mexican markets as a revenue source for the Confederacy. Another alternative that arose in Fayette County was to form a stay-at-home company of troops; most were unofficial and served only to allow members to avoid official conscription.

The experience of Anthony M. Dignowity provides an example of Czech resistance to the Confederacy. Dignowity was a Czech immigrant who traveled to Texas in 1835 and worked in many professions before becoming a physician in San Antonio. He opposed the Texas Revolution, viewing it as a means to increase the power of slave states in the United States, and thus did not settle in Texas until after it was admitted to the US. During the Civil War, his anti-slavery views made him a target for lynching parties, causing him to flee Texas and travel to Washington, D.C., where he stayed for the rest of the war working for the Department of the Interior. While in D.C., Dignowity proposed a plan to Congress detailing the capture and reinstatement of Texas based on the support of immigrant groups, such as the Czechs and Germans, who opposed slavery, but Congress did not act upon it. Meanwhile, Dignowity's son, Anthony Francis Dignowity, was conscripted into the Confederate Army and given the task of painting the personal carriage of General Hamilton Bee, which he completed before escaping and enlisting in the Union Army.

Czech women, already familiar with the hard work of farming, managed to keep their farms and homes running during the war while their husbands were serving in the military or in hiding. In addition to the regular farm responsibilities, families also had to produce homemade commodities to substitute for increasingly expensive goods such as coffee and sugar.

== Culture ==
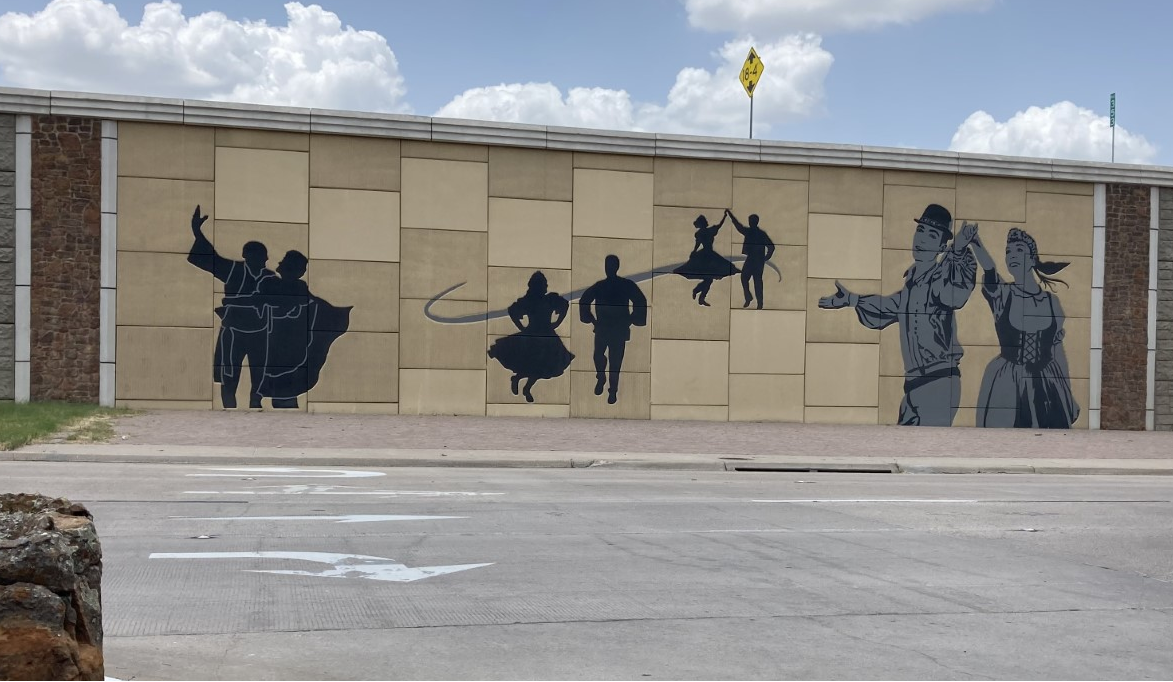
Decoration on a West, TX overpass that serves as a memorial to the Czech culture of the city.

Czexan culture is shaped by the unique adaptation of Czech culture to a Texas environment, and Czech dances, celebrations, and events are held on a regular basis.

The National Polka Festival is an annual parade and festival held in Ennis, Texas celebrating the Czech heritage in the city. The 3-day festival is held every Memorial Day weekend. Most of the dance halls offer a lunch or dinner with Czech foods such as klobása (sausage), sauerkraut, and koláče, as well as live entertainment with Czexan polka music and dancing. Ennis also holds the annual Czech Music Festival focussing on Czexan music and dancing.

Temple is home to the Czech Heritage Museum. A Fayetteville museum celebrates Texas's Czech settlement. In Caldwell is the Burleson County Czech Heritage Museum. In 2004, the Texas Czech Heritage and Cultural Center was opened in LaGrange. Houston's Czech Center Museum Houston features Czech and Slovak culture, art, and history. Praha hosts the Praha Church Picnic, also known as the Pražská Pouť, which is celebrated with Catholic mass, food, Czexan music, and dancing. The city of West hosts Westfest every Labor Day, which includes a Koláče baking contest and a Taroky tournament. Crosby, northeast of Houston, hosts a Czech Fest and a Koláče Bake. The Czech Heritage Society of Texas has developed 14 chapters throughout the state.

The available literature about Texas Czechs and their history has expanded with advent of self-publishing, which has made it possible for amateur historians to distribute their works. One author has declared Mr. Albert Blaha of Houston "the Father of Texas Czech History", saying that "He is our own František Palacký." Naše Dějiny, "a magazine of Texas Czech genealogy, history and culture" was founded in 1983. The Library of the SPJST (Slavonic Benevolent Order of the State of Texas), founded in Temple in 1963, has holdings which "include over 20,000 volumes, the vast majority of which deal with Czech or Texas Czech topics."

In 2013, The Texas Czech Genealogical Society hosted the "From Generation to Generation Research Conference" for those interested in exploring Czech ancestry.

In 2017 HR1229 was submitted in the Texas Legislature by State Representative James White and it stated "That the House of Representatives of the 85th Texas Legislature here by recognize September 30, 2017, as Czech Heritage Day in Texas and honor the contributions of Czechs and people of Czech descent to this state."

== Texas Czech dialect ==
12,805 Texans can speak the Czech language.

Drawing on Boas's model for interviewing speakers of the language and digitally cataloging the dialects, John Tomecek founded and Lida Cope of East Carolina University developed the Texas Czech Legacy Project at the University of Texas at Austin to document and preserve the dwindling language.

Because the majority of Texas immigrants came from Moravia, the Czech spoken in Texas is largely characterized by Moravian dialects (Lachian and Moravian Wallachian) which vary to some extent from the Bohemian dialects spoken by most Czech-Americans. Czech-language journalism has been very active in the state over the years. Thirty-three newspapers and periodicals have been published. As of 1993 one weekly newspaper, Našinec, published at Granger, and one monthly, Hospodář, published at West, were still being published entirely in Czech. Other periodicals such as Věstník and the Brethren Journal contained sections printed in Czech.

== Notable Czech Texans ==
- John E. Blaha, NASA astronaut
- Hunter Cervenka, baseball player
- Mel Deutsch, baseball player
- Leopold Karpeles, Civil War Medal of Honor recipient (Czech-Jewish immigrant)
- Madison Kocian, Olympic gymnast
- Randal Grichuk, baseball player
- Frank Malina, aeronautical engineer
- Mark Matejka, Lynyrd Skynyrd guitarist
- Logan Ondrusek, baseball player
- Scott Podsednik, baseball player
- Paxton Pomykal, soccer player
- Sissy Spacek, actress
- Bill Svoboda, football player
- Rip Torn, actor
- Kim Zmeskal, Olympic gymnast
- Patrick Zurek, Catholic bishop

== See also ==
- Czech Stop and Little Czech Bakery
- National Polka Festival
- Tejano music
- Texas German
- Texas Silesian
- Wends of Texas
- Czech Americans
- Austrian Americans

== Relevant literature ==
- Barton, Frances & John K. Novak. Czech Songs in Texas. University of Oklahoma Press. 2021
- Dutkova, Lida (1998) Texas Czech: An ethnolinguistic study. Ph.D. dissertation. University of Arizona at Tucson.
- Dutkova-Cope, Lida. 2001. The Language of the Czech Moravians: Do you know what "Párknu kára u hauza" means? Southwest Journal of Linguistics 20.2:51-84.
- Eckert, E. (1993) Language change: The testimony of Czech tombstone inscriptions in Praha, Texas. In E. Eckert (ed.), Varieties in Czech. Atlanta: Rodopi, 189–215.
