= West, Texas =

- City
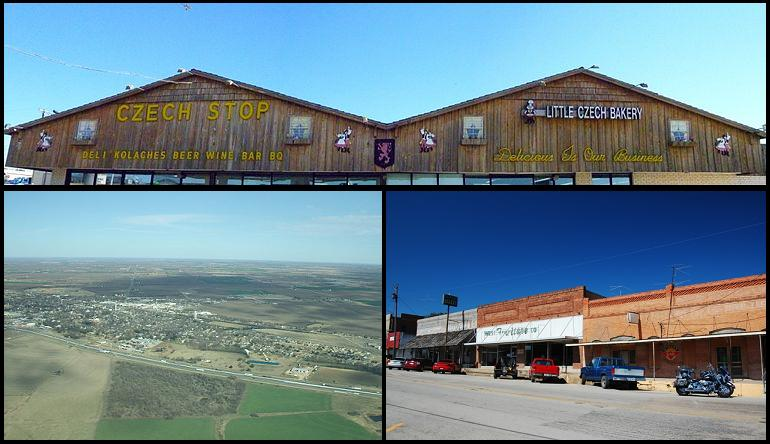
- Top: Czech Stop & Little Czech Bakery, Bottom Left: Aerial view of the town of West, Texas — looking northeast, Bottom Right: View from Oak Street
- Nickname: Home of the Official Kolache of the Texas Legislature
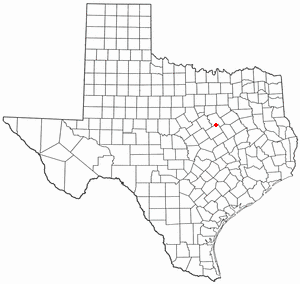
- Location of West, Texas

- Coordinates: 31°48′11″N 97°05′41″W
- Country: United States
- State: Texas
- County: McLennan
- Incorporated: 1892

Area
  - Total: 1.66 sq mi (4.30 km^{2})
  - Land: 1.66 sq mi (4.30 km^{2})
  - Water: 0 sq mi (0.00 km^{2})
- Elevation: 650 ft (200 m)

Population (2020)
  - Total: 2,531
  - Density: 1,797.8/sq mi (694.12/km^{2})
- Time zone: UTC-6 (Central (CST))
  - Summer (DST): UTC-5 (CDT)
- ZIP Code: 76691
- Area code: 254, exchange 826
- FIPS code: 48-77332
- GNIS feature ID: 2412216
- Website: www.cityofwest.com

West is a city in McLennan County, Texas, United States. As of the 2020 census, the population was 2,531. It is named after Thomas West, the city's first postmaster. The city is in north-central Texas, about 70 miles (110 km) south of the Dallas–Fort Worth metroplex, 20 miles north of Waco, and 120 miles north of Austin.

Despite its name, the city is not in West Texas; area residents sometimes call the community "West comma Texas" to avoid confusion.

As of 2012 it has one of the largest concentrations of Czech Texans of any city in the state.

== History ==
The first settlers of northern McLennan County arrived in the 1840s. They were farm and ranch families drawn from the east by the rich lands made available by the government sale of land to build schools in Texas. The area farmers cultivated the land and grew cotton, wheat, and grain sorghum, and raised cattle. The farming community centered on a freshwater spring that became known as Bold Springs. In 1860, Bold Springs had a population of about 300 and provided services such as a blacksmith, churches, and a post office.

The Missouri–Kansas–Texas Railroad was laid between Hillsboro and Waco in 1881. The path of the railroad passed through land owned by Thomas West, who had moved to the area in 1859. He farmed land that he had purchased and served as postmaster of Bold Springs. A train depot and station was built on the land he sold to the railroad company and the land running beside the tracks was divided into small sections and sold to people wanting to start businesses. The new depot and station included a post office, and since West served as postmaster, the settlement became known as West's Station, then West Station, and finally West. Mr. West opened the first general store and became a successful businessman as he later owned a hotel, a furniture store, and a bank.

The railroad brought prosperity to the area during the 1880s. More businesses opened and more surrounding land was purchased. Czech immigrants came to the area, purchasing the rich lands to farm and start a fresh life in the new world. They also opened businesses and shared their culture. By the 1890s, the Czech businesses flourished in West. On June 11, 1892, West was officially organized into a town. It had become the center of commerce for the area. There were cotton gins, grocery stores, churches, schools, and doctors' offices.

The temporary city Crush, three miles (5 km) south of West, was the location of The Crash at Crush, a head-on collision between two locomotives that was staged on September 15, 1896, as a publicity stunt for the Missouri–Kansas–Texas Railroad. Over 30,000 spectators gathered at the crash site, named "crush" for MKT passenger agent William Crush, who conceived the idea. About 4 p.m. the trains were sent speeding toward each other. Contrary to mechanics' predictions, the steam boilers exploded on impact, propelling pieces of metal into the crowd. Two people were killed and many others injured, including Jarvis Deane of Waco, who was photographing the event and lost an eye. Texas Historical Marker 5315, on Interstate 35 northbound frontage road, between Mangrum and Wiggins Road, commemorates the event.

The turn of the century brought electricity, running water, and natural gas. The population of West and surrounding area grew. Many of the original settlers' descendants continue to farm the lands and run the businesses. Czech is still spoken by some of the older residents.

=== 2013 explosion ===
On April 17, 2013, a fire broke out at West Fertilizer Co., a fertilizer plant on the north side of town that stored ammonium nitrate, a fertilizer that can also be used as an explosive. The fire triggered two explosions milliseconds apart. The massive blasts killed 15 people, including 12 first responders, and injured at least 200. It destroyed nearby schools, an apartment complex, and a nursing home, and damaged hundreds of homes in the surrounding area.

The explosion, which measured as a 2.1 magnitude earthquake, garnered much media attention. President Barack Obama and Texas Governor Rick Perry attended the memorial for first responders.

A month-long investigation could not determine the cause of the explosion, because multiple possible causes could not be ruled out. The possibilities include arson, an electrical glitch, and a golf cart that overheated.

In 2016 the Bureau of Alcohol, Tobacco, Firearms and Explosives concluded that the fire that caused the explosion was set deliberately. But ATF never presented any evidence of arson. A comprehensive investigation by the U.S. Chemical Safety and Hazard Investigation Board (CSB) publicized in 2016 found no evidence of foul play. The causes of the explosion and recommendations for prevention can be found on www.CSB.gov under West Fertilizer Company (Completed Investigations).

== Geography ==
According to the United States Census Bureau, the city has an area of 4.0 mi^{2} (10 km^{2}), all land. Most of the city is on the east side of Interstate 35.

=== Climate ===
The climate in this area is characterized by hot, humid summers and generally mild to cool winters. According to the Köppen Climate Classification system, West has a humid subtropical climate, abbreviated "Cfa" on climate maps.

== Demographics ==
Historical population
Census	Pop.	Note	%±
1900	851		—
1910	1,645		93.3%
1920	1,629		−1.0%
1930	1,807		10.9%
1940	1,979		9.5%
1950	2,130		7.6%
1960	2,352		10.4%
1970	2,406		2.3%
1980	2,485		3.3%
1990	2,515		1.2%
2000	2,692		7.0%
2010	2,807		4.3%
2020	2,531		−9.8%
U.S. Decennial Census

=== 2020 census ===
As of the 2020 census, West had a population of 2,531, 1,008 households, and 635 families residing in the city. The median age was 42.1 years; 22.5% of residents were under the age of 18 and 19.7% of residents were 65 years of age or older. For every 100 females there were 86.7 males, and for every 100 females age 18 and over there were 80.0 males age 18 and over.

Of the 1,008 households in West, 34.4% had children under the age of 18 living in them. Of all households, 45.9% were married-couple households, 17.3% were households with a male householder and no spouse or partner present, and 31.4% were households with a female householder and no spouse or partner present. About 30.3% of all households were made up of individuals and 13.4% had someone living alone who was 65 years of age or older.

There were 1,098 housing units, of which 8.2% were vacant. The homeowner vacancy rate was 1.2% and the rental vacancy rate was 0.6%.

0.0% of residents lived in urban areas, while 100.0% lived in rural areas.

Racial composition as of the 2020 census
Race	Number	Percent
White	2,062	81.5%
Black or African American	77	3.0%
American Indian and Alaska Native	16	0.6%
Asian	2	0.1%
Native Hawaiian and Other Pacific Islander	1	0.0%
Some other race	156	6.2%
Two or more races	217	8.6%
Hispanic or Latino (of any race)	365	14.4%

=== 2010 census ===
As of the 2010 census, 2,807 people, 1,045 households, and 698 families resided in the city. The population density was 1,754.3 people per square mile (701.7/km). There were 1,219 housing units at an average density of 761.8 per square mile (294.1/km^{2}). The racial makeup of the city was 89.0% White, 3.9% African American, 0.9% Native American, 0.2% Asian, 6.9% from other and two or more races. Hispanics or Latinos of any race were 13.8% of the population. The majority of the White population is of Czech descent (and West was officially designated "Home of the Official Kolache of the Texas Legislature" in 1997).

Of the 1,045 households, 35.6% had children under the age of 18 living with them, 45.6% were married couples living together, 15.0% had a female householder with no husband present, and 34.9% were non family households. About 31.7% of all households were made up of individuals living alone, and 33.0% were households with an individual who was 65 years of age or older. The average household size was 2.45 and the average family size was 3.1.

In the city, the population was distributed as 28.3% of those who are 19 years and younger, 10.8% from 20 to 29, 25.0% from 30 to 49, 14.8% from 50 to 64, and 21.0% who were 65 years of age or older. The median age was 38.9 years. West has a 53% female and 47% male population.

The median income for a household in the city was $35,929, and for a family was $44,485. Males had a median income of $31,055 versus $27,917 for females. The per capita income for the city was $18,850. About 13.8% of families and 18.3% of the population were below the poverty line, including 28.0% of those under age 18 and 13.9% of those age 65 or over.

It is part of the Waco metropolitan area.

== Area events ==
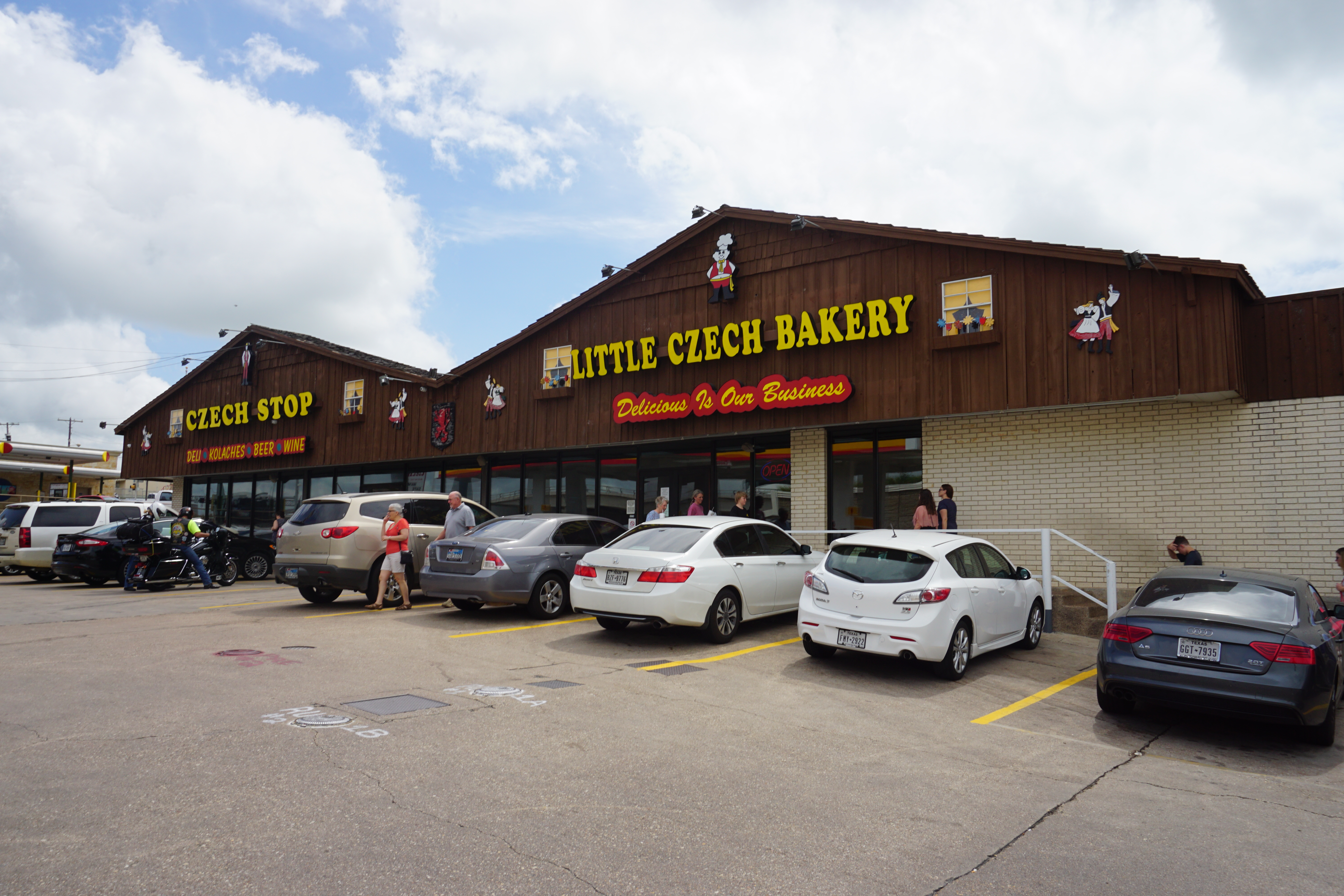
The Czech Stop and Little Czech Bakery in West

Westfest is a festival celebrating the city's large Czech population and their heritage.

== Education ==
The city of West is served by the West Independent School District, and is home to the West High School Trojans.

== Infrastructure ==
Interstate 35 and Union Pacific Railroad pass through the city.

== Notable people ==
- Cliff Bartosh, former left-handed relief pitcher in Major League Baseball
- Buster Chatham, baseball player
- Joe Eisma, comic book artist for Image Comics, DC Comics, and Archie Comics
- James "Slim" Hand, country-western artist, performer and actor
- Ray Kubala, American football player
- Scott Podsednik, Major League Baseball outfielder; hit walk-off home run for Chicago White Sox in Game 2 of the 2005 World Series.

== Gallery ==
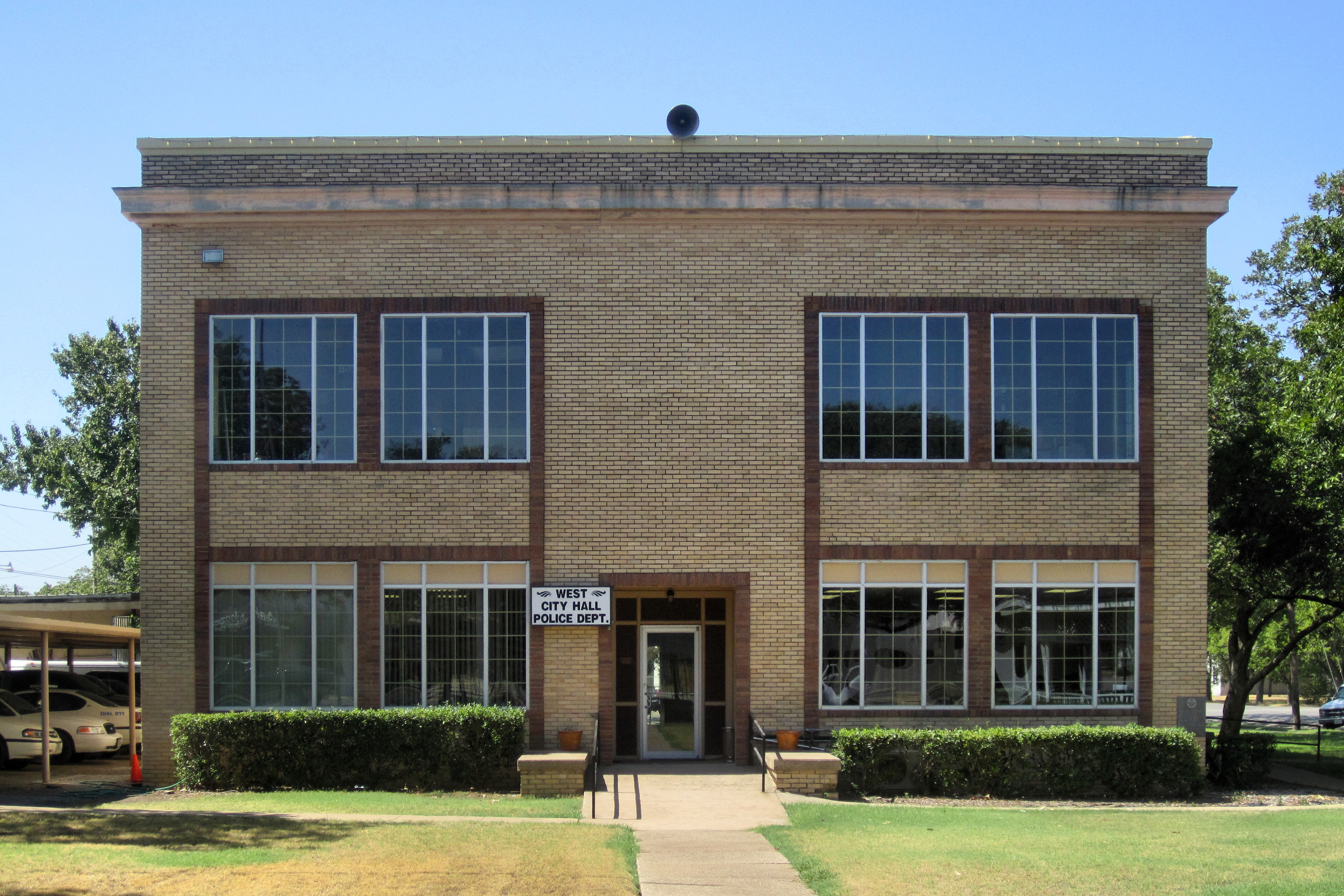
The City Hall and Police Department in West

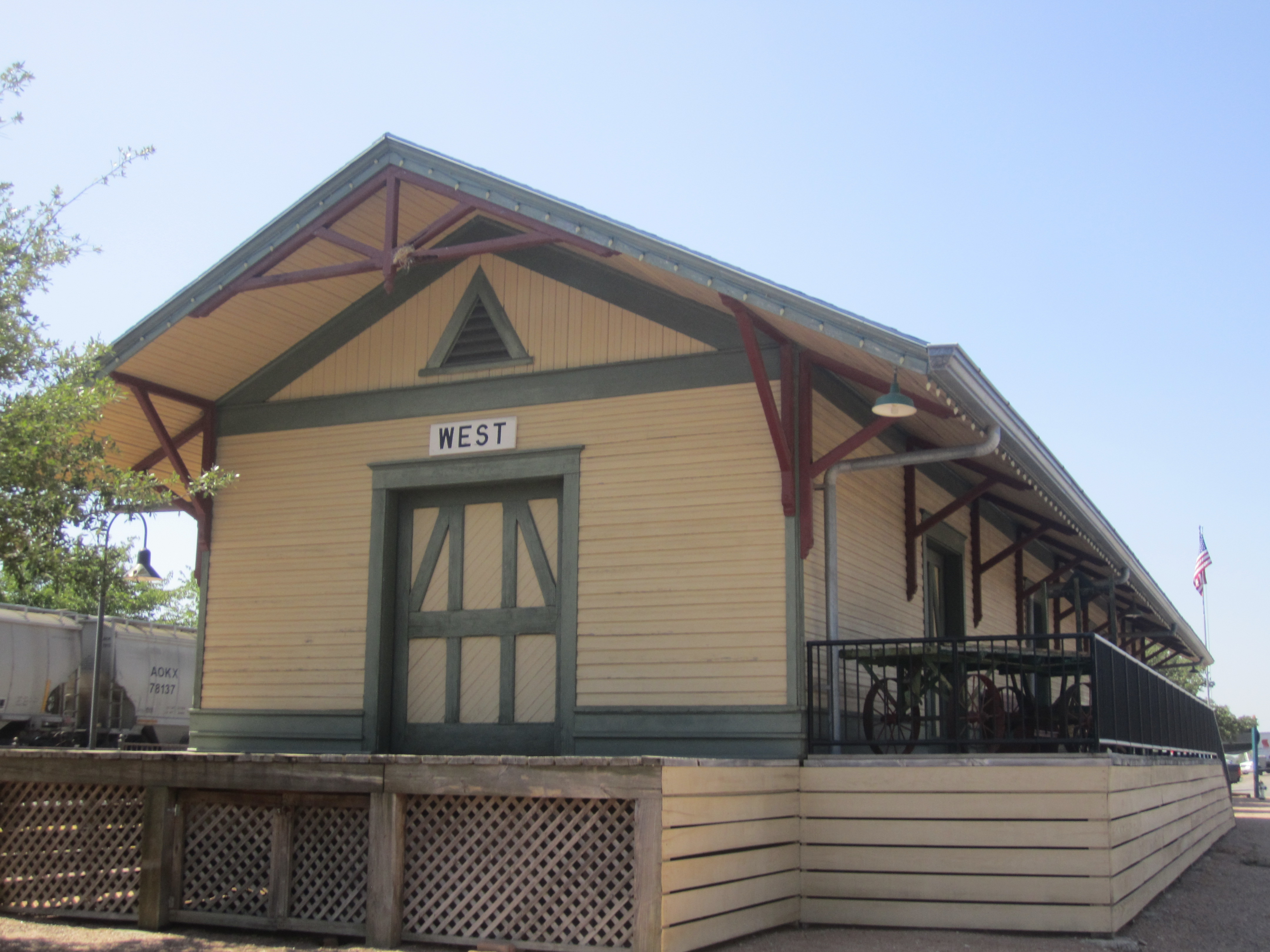
Restored railroad depot in West

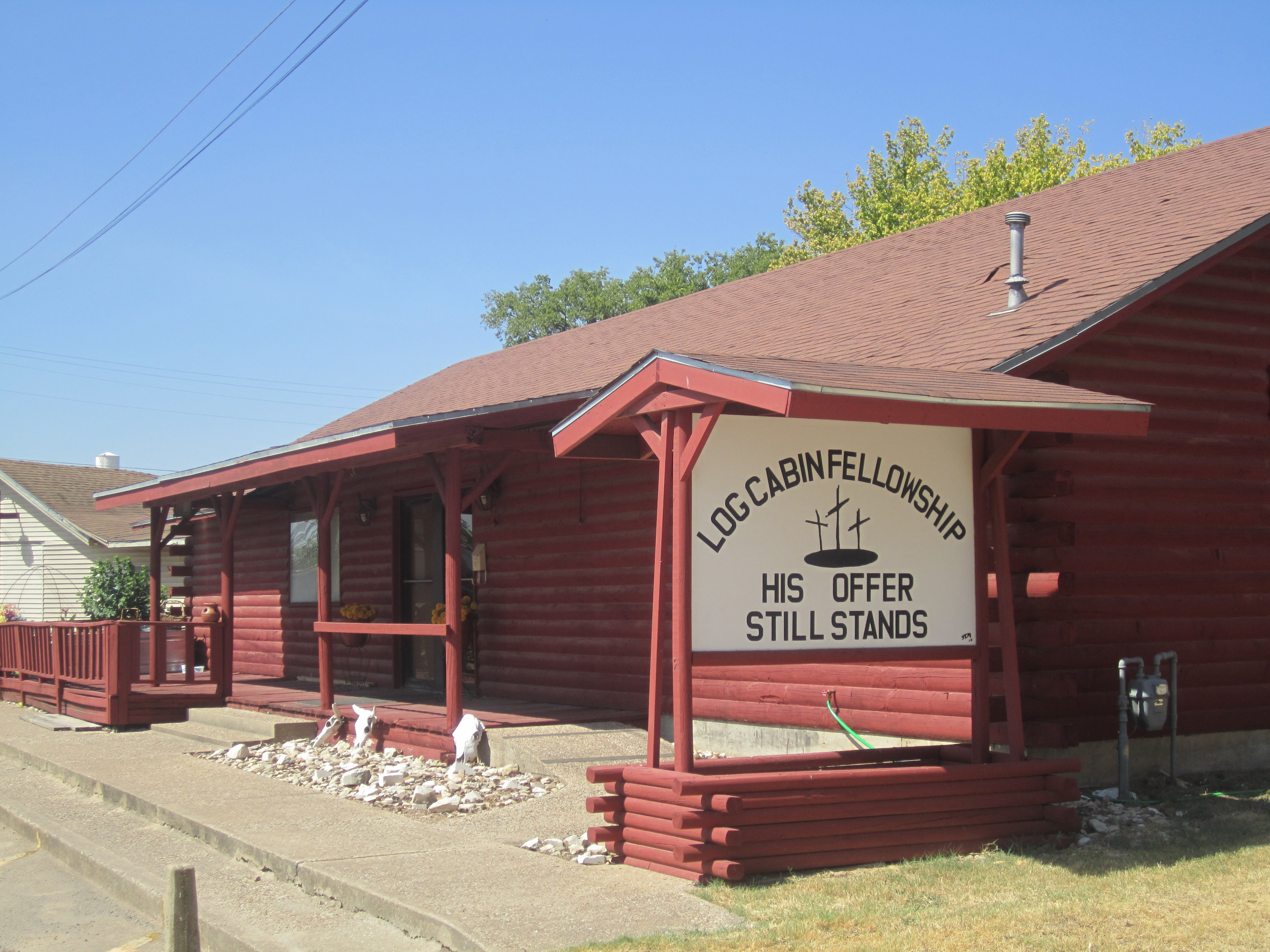
"His Offer Still Stands": Log Cabin Fellowship church in West

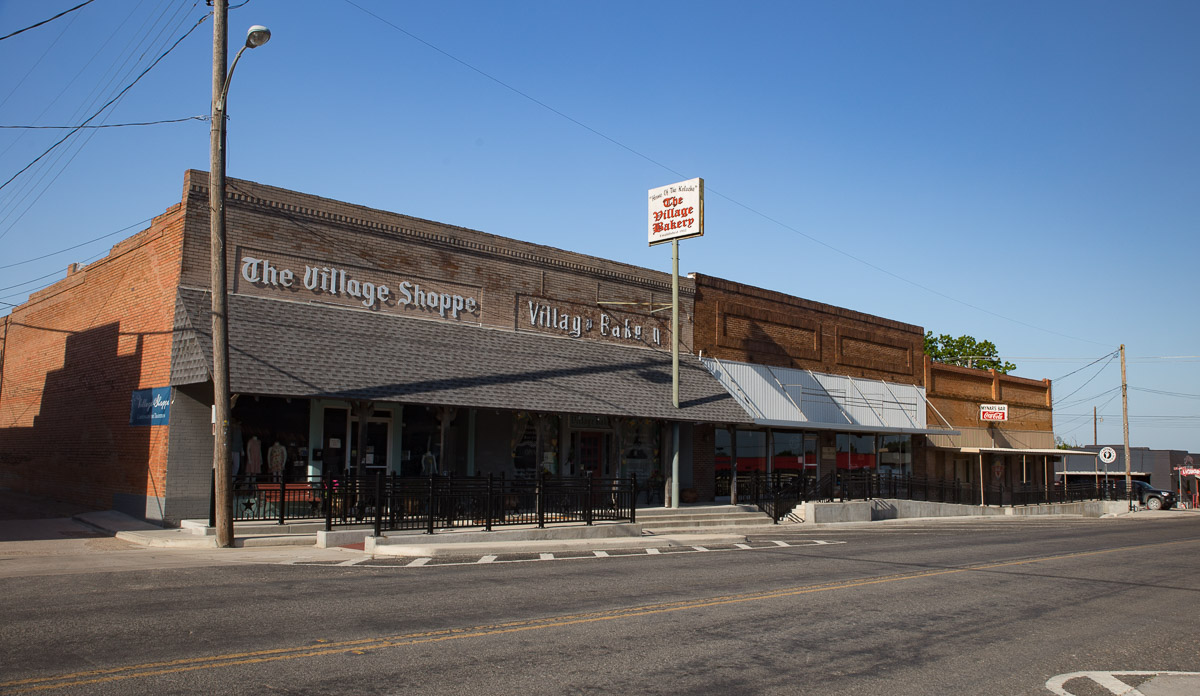
Village Shoppe and Bakery in downtown West

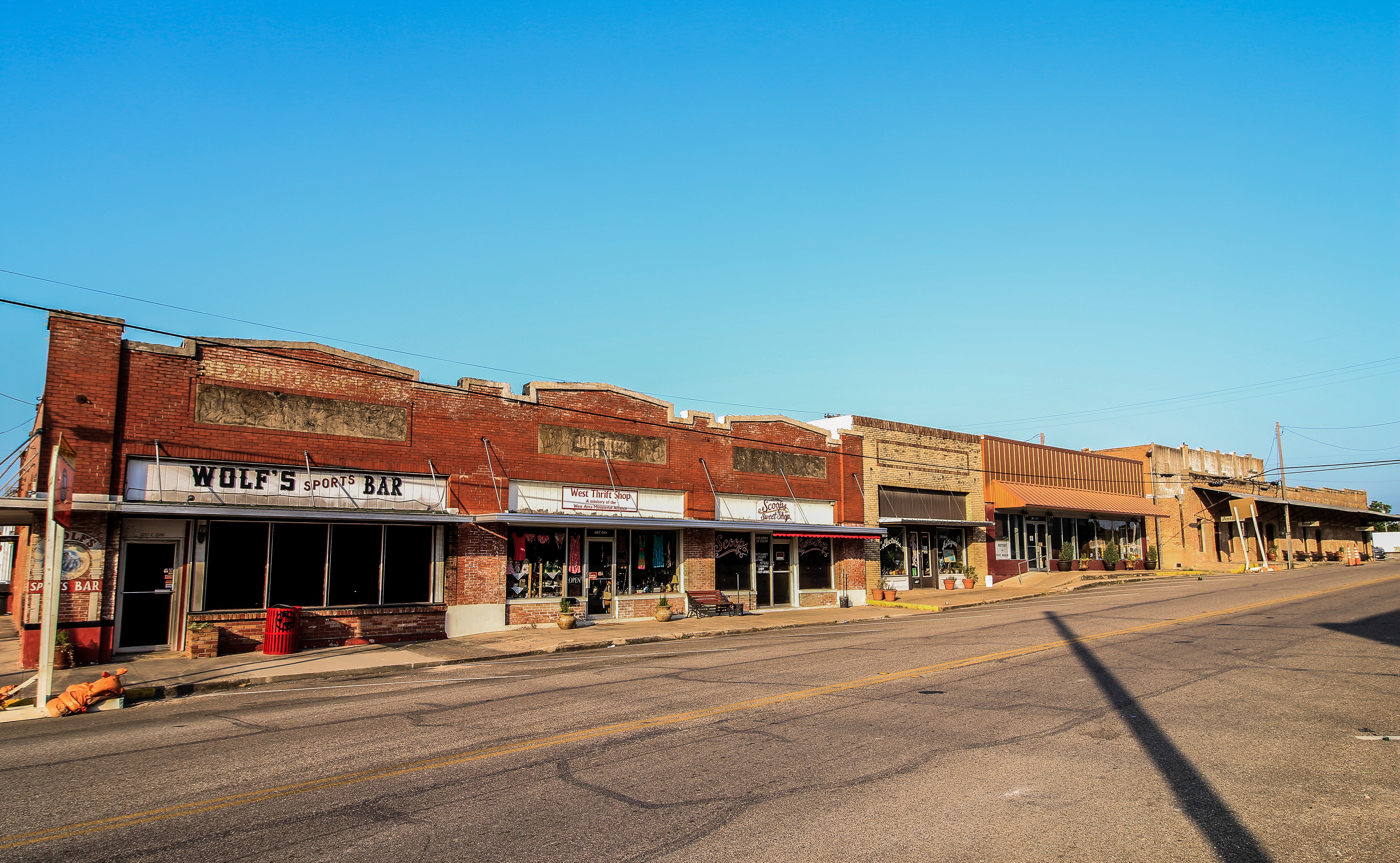
Downtown West, Texas

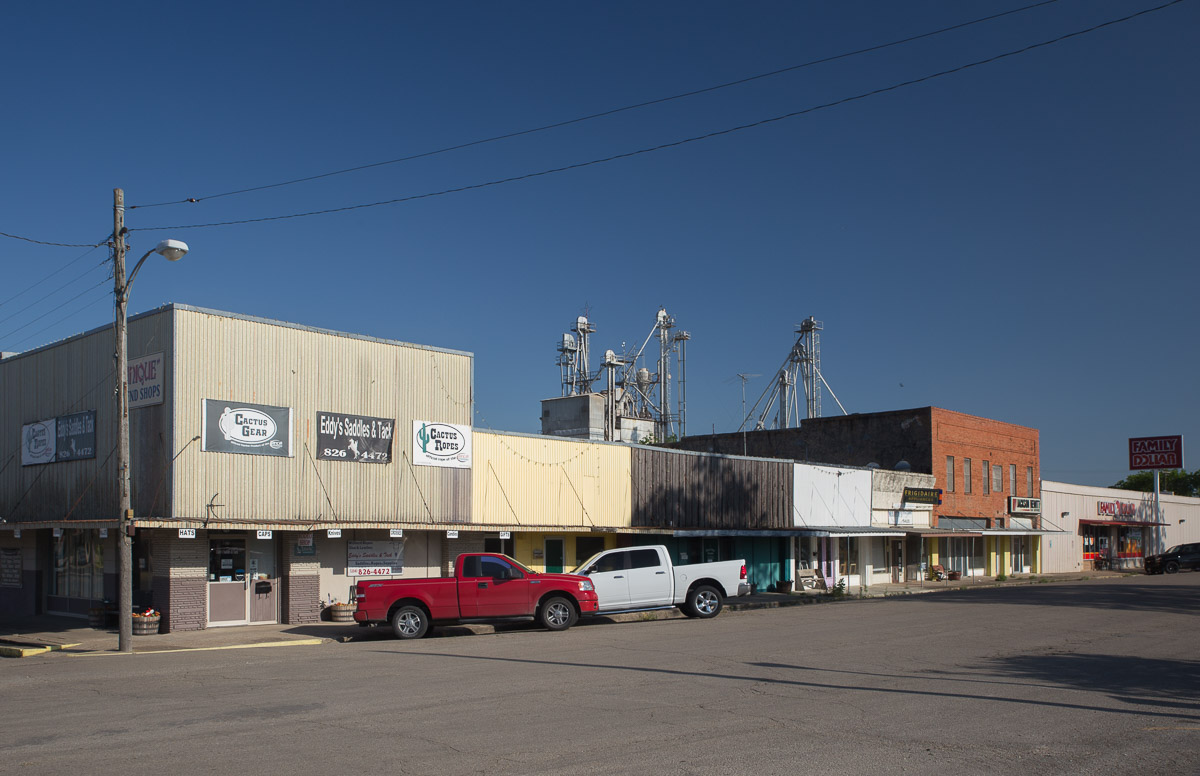
Downtown West, Texas

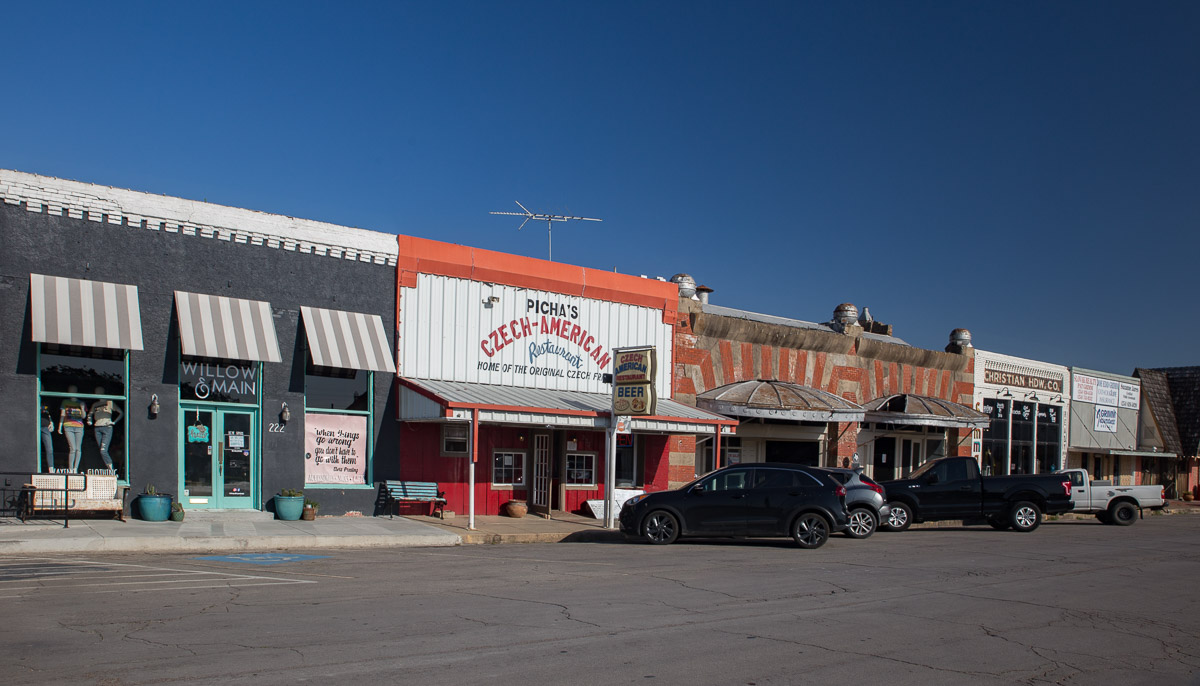
Restaurant and historic Best Theater

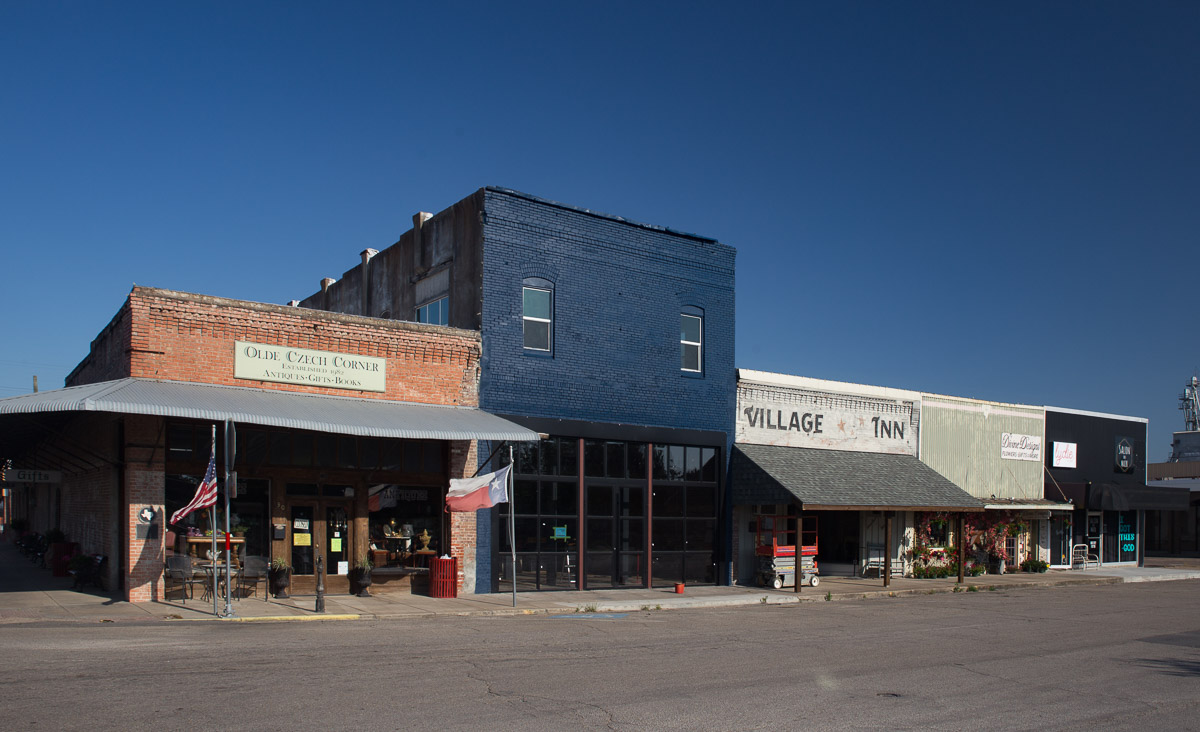
Downtown West, Texas

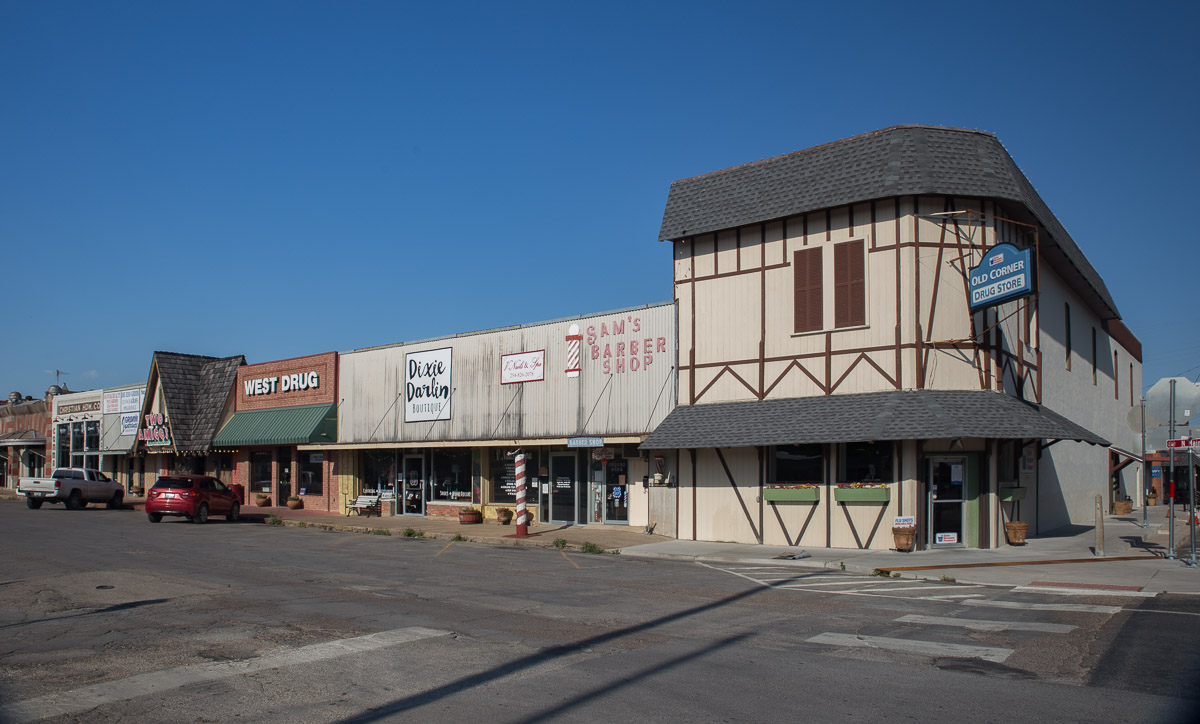
Old bank building in downtown West, Texas

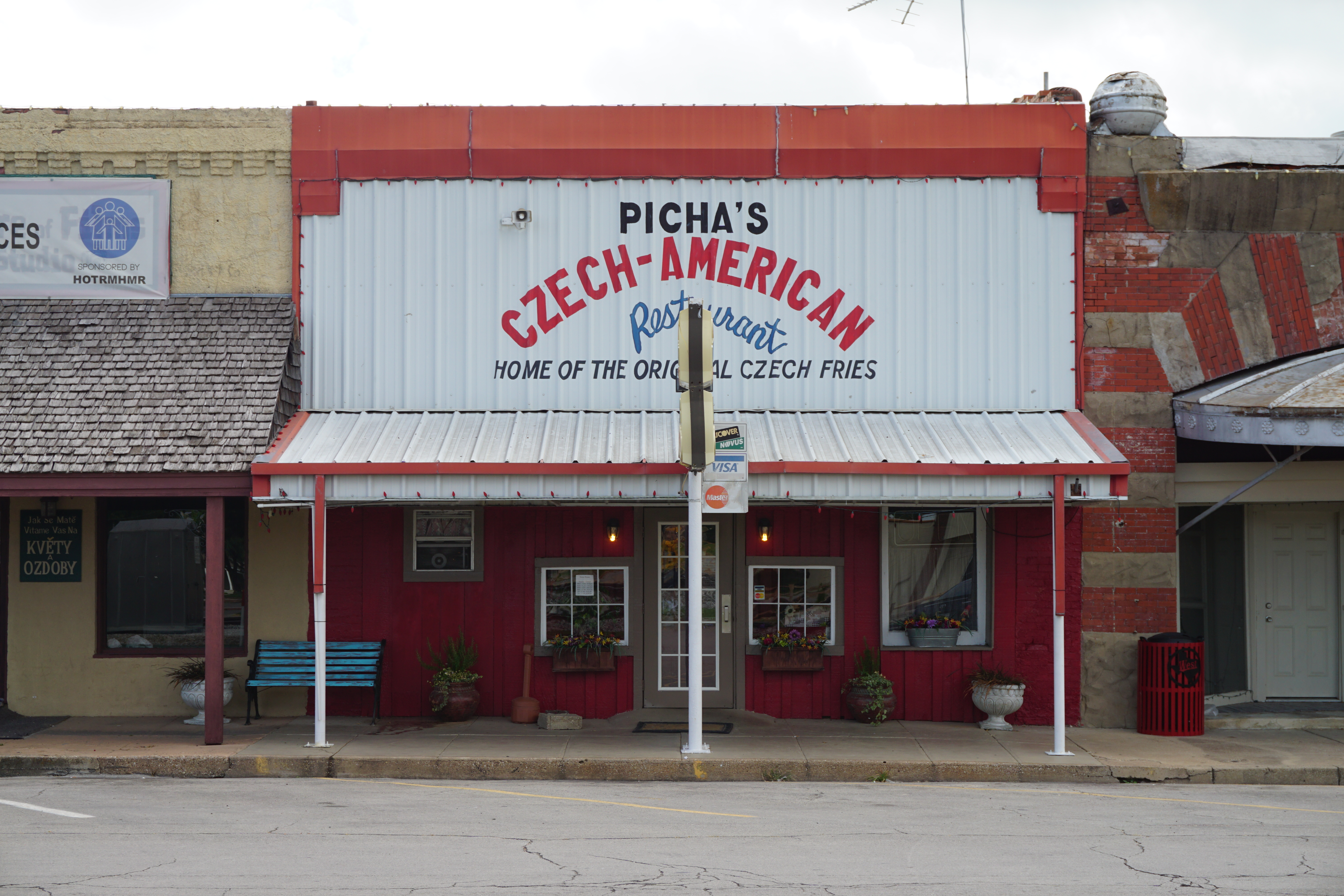
Picha's Czech-American Restaurant

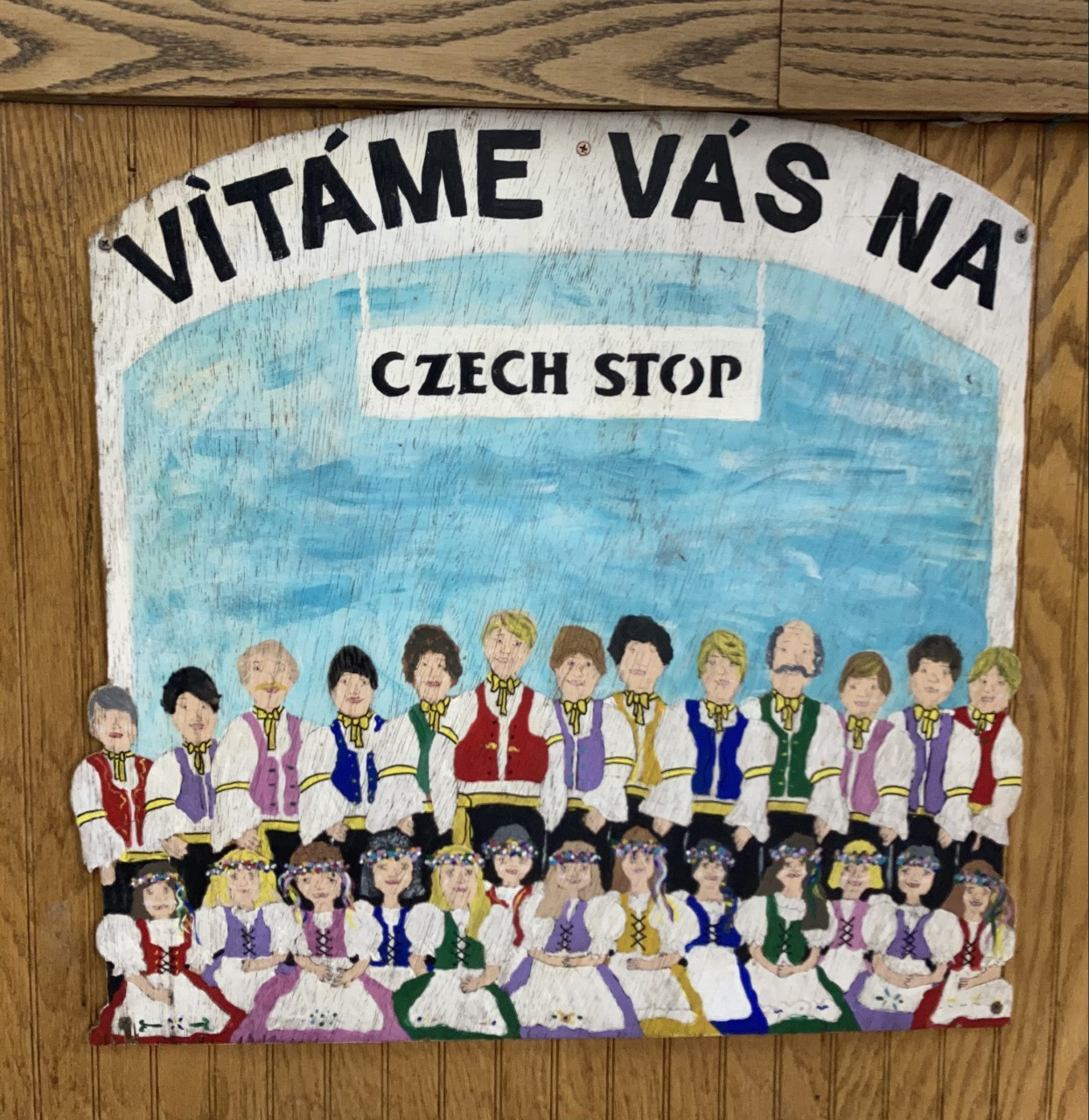
Czech sign at the Czech Stop

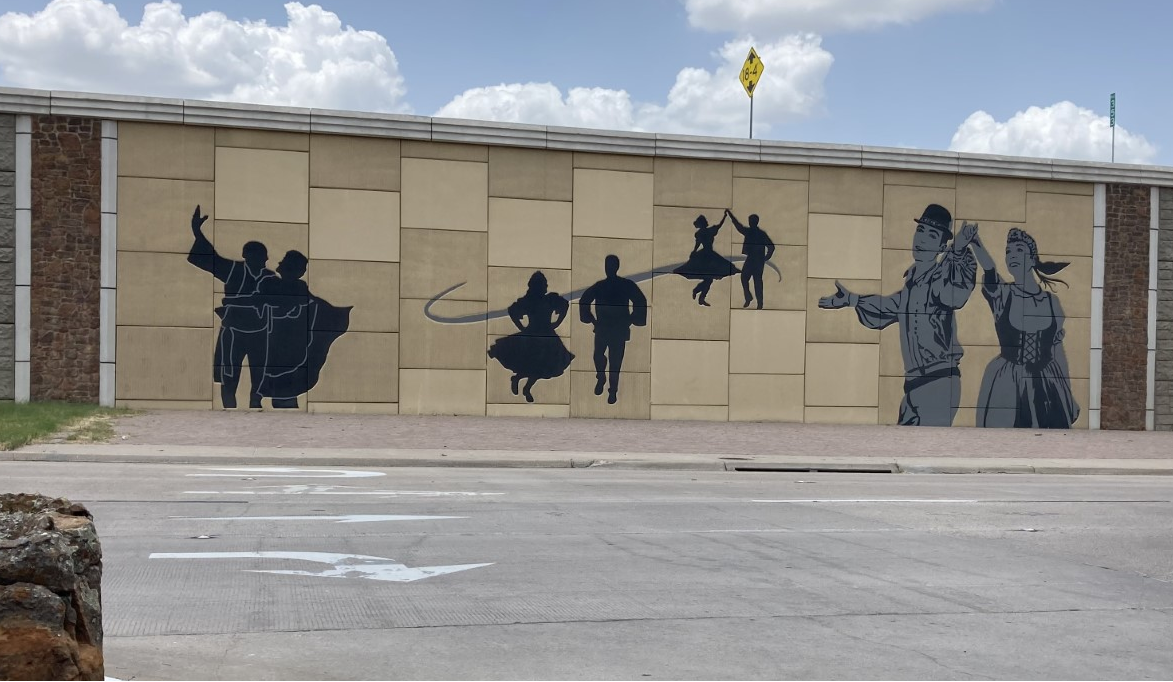
Czech-themed art on the east side I-35

== See also ==
- Operation Last Call
