= Operation Last Call =

Operation Last Call is the name of a law enforcement operation in the state of Texas in which undercover agents of the Texas Alcoholic Beverage Commission made arrests for public intoxication in places that serve alcoholic beverages. The aim of the operation, which was first announced in August 2005, was to prevent drunk driving.

The operation was suspended in April 2006 after extensive protests from the public.

In September 2006 the TABC would continue to make these types of arrests at local cultural festivals such as WestFest, a Czech heritage festival located on private grounds in West, Texas.

According to the Houston Chronicle, 1,740 people statewide were arrested in connection with Operation Last Call.
