= National Polka Festival =

The National Polka Festival is an annual parade and festival held in Ennis, Texas celebrating the Czech heritage in the city. The 3-day festival is held every Memorial Day weekend. The 3 fraternal halls offer a lunch or dinner with Czech foods such as klobase (sausage), sauerkraut, and kolache, as well as live entertainment with traditional polka music and dancing.

== History ==
The beginning of the National Polka Festival in Ennis, Texas began as an idea. Raymond Zapletal, Len Gehrig, and Joe Liska of Ennis had been to other cities and seen the large response to polka bands from the people of Czechoslovak descent, and they believed the people could be brought to their small town of Ennis for the same reasons. So in 1967, Zapletal, Gehrig, and Liska brought their idea to the Chamber of Commerce manager Jack McKay. If the idea were to succeed, it would require the joint effort of the Chamber and the citizens of Ennis. Jack McKay agreed the idea could greatly benefit Ennis and the Czechoslovak community in the area, and one of the largest polka festival in the country had its beginning. Zapletal, Gehrig, and Liska agreed to take care of getting the bands for Ennis' fraternal halls and the Chamber agreed in turn to organize the parade and downtown festivities. Within three years the festival was a raging success with as many as 30,000 people attending from all over the country to enjoy music and entertainment at the four halls.

2020 saw the COVID-19 pandemic as grounds for cancellation.

=== Tradition ===
The festival continues in tradition and style similar to those early celebrations. The founders and their successors have insisted on maintaining the authenticity and values of the Czech tradition even today. All entries of the parade, street dancing, and bands performing are encouraged to have Czech themes and play Czech music. The festival has taken years of work from the Polka Festival Committee, Chamber of Commerce, and the Ennis Convention & Visitors Bureau. This festival today is one of the largest of its kind in the United States attracting as many as 50,000 people.

Over the years, the festival has added a Grammy award-winning band such as Brave Combo. The Jodie Mikula Orchestra, Czech and Then Some, Texas Dutchmen, Dujka Brother's, Czechaholics, Malek's Fishermen, Becky and the Ivanhoe Dutchmen, Jim Bochnicek Orchestra, Barry Boyce Trio, Squeezebox, Ennis Czech Boys, Fritz Hodde and the Fabulous Six, Alex Meixner, Vrazels' Polka Band, and many more bands from across Texas, the United States and the Czech Republic have played the festival. The festival receives advertising support from 96.3 FM KSCS. This is one of the only festivals that have three spacious halls with large dance floors where you can dance and enjoy anything from a good polka, waltz, or even a folk dance. On Friday night of the festival a king and queen dance contest was added in 1986 to start the festivities. The festival has one of the biggest parades in the Dallas–Fort Worth metroplex. After the parade there is an abundance of activities held in downtown Ennis to be enjoyed by the entire family.

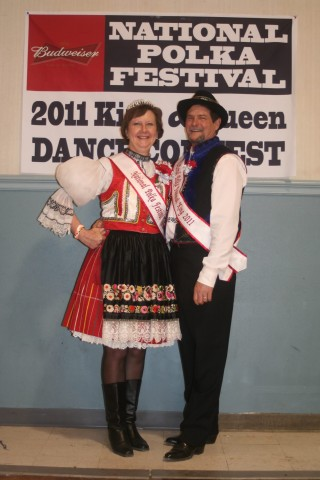
2011 National Polka Festival King and Queen

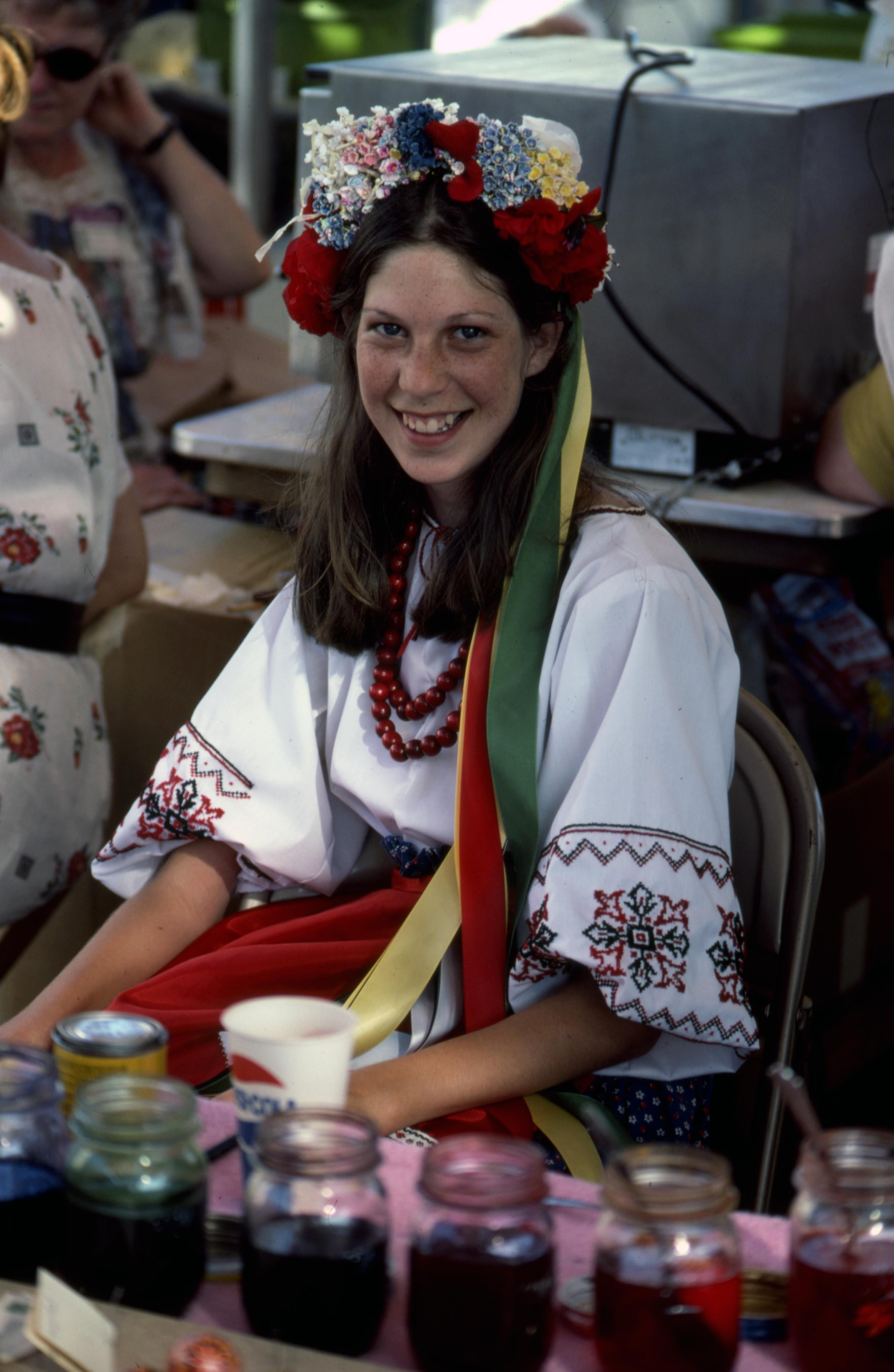
Girl in americanized kroj, 1976

Raymond Zapletal's son, Danny Zapletal, was the executive director for 25 years retiring in 2016. Danny continues to help in any way he can with the festival and the committee. Raymond's daughter, Michelle Zapletal Slovak, is the secretary of the festival and has been since 1995.

== Details ==
The three-day event is every Memorial Day weekend. Festivities begin with music and a king and queen contest on Friday night, followed by a 5K and 10K race and a 1K walk starting at 7 a.m. weather permitting. Tent vendors wind through the streets offering a variety of goods from hand crafted art to clothes and food. The party then moves to the community halls in town, Sokol, KJT and Knights of Columbus, where bands will perform and Czech food is offered throughout the weekend. Free shuttle buses are offered from the halls to downtown through Saturday and Sunday.

=== Further details ===
The parade will start promptly at 10 am, rain or shine. The parade begins on N. Clay Street and runs through downtown on Ennis Avenue, turning south onto Main street where it ends. The city will have closed off parking along the route and crowds will begin gathering around 9 o'clock to get a good vantage point. Anywhere along Ennis Avenue is good but the area around the intersection with Dallas Street provides some of the best background for good photos. Street parking is available on the adjacent downtown streets and on the grass along the railroad where the parade ends. The parade is fairly lengthy and chairs and umbrellas (for sun or rain) are advisable.

Browse the vendor tents before the parade, but remember to stake out a good parade viewing place before hand. Weather permitting, live polka band music will be playing at noon at the downtown stage. There is all the typical food fare like turkey legs, BBQ and funnel cakes but this is a special occasion where klobase sandwiches, klobase on a stick, sauerkraut boats and kolache are sold.

After the parades, three of the fraternal halls open at 11:30am with performances by various bands and dance troupes. Guests can pay at the door of each for admission or can purchase a weekend or day pass for all three. Each of the halls offer a generous Czech food menu.

=== Gallery ===
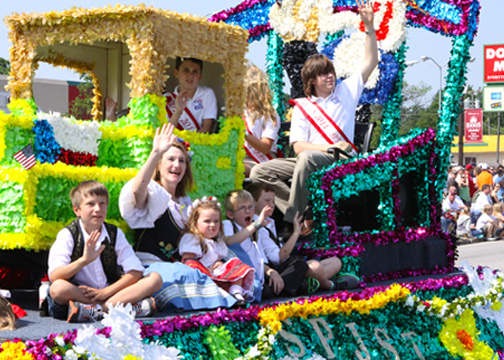
2012 National Polka Festival Parade

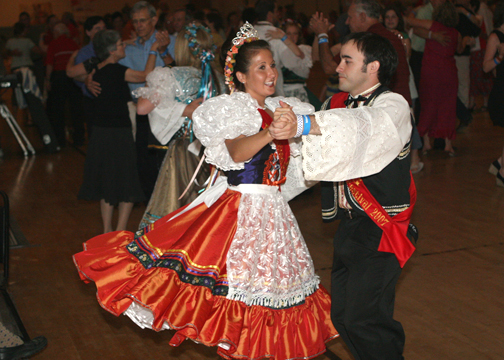
2012 Polka Dancers

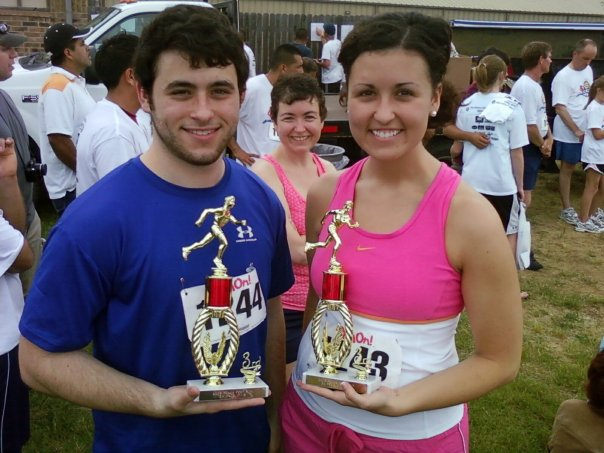
2009 Polka Run Winners

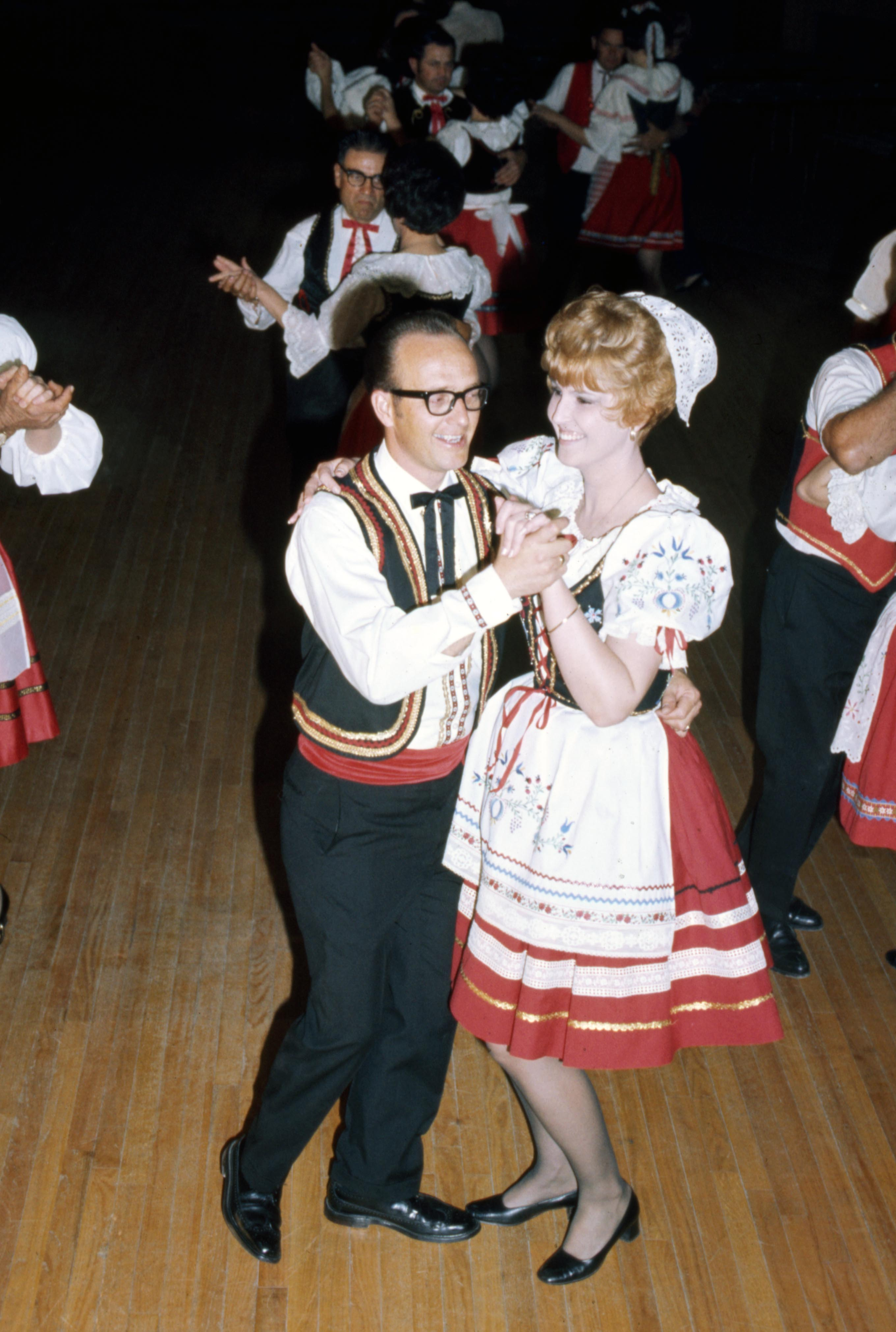
1971 Polka dancers

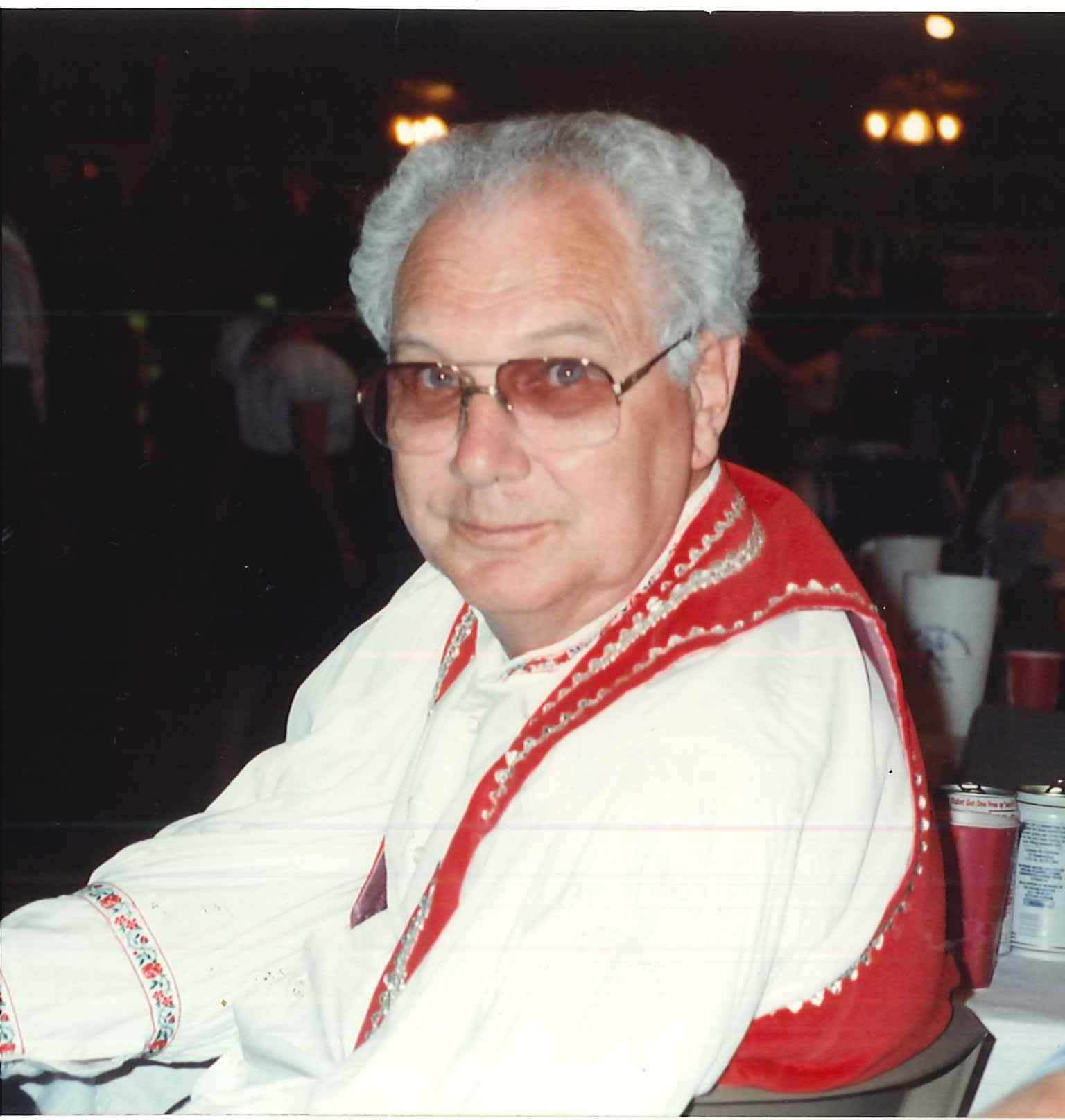
Raymond Zapletal – Founder

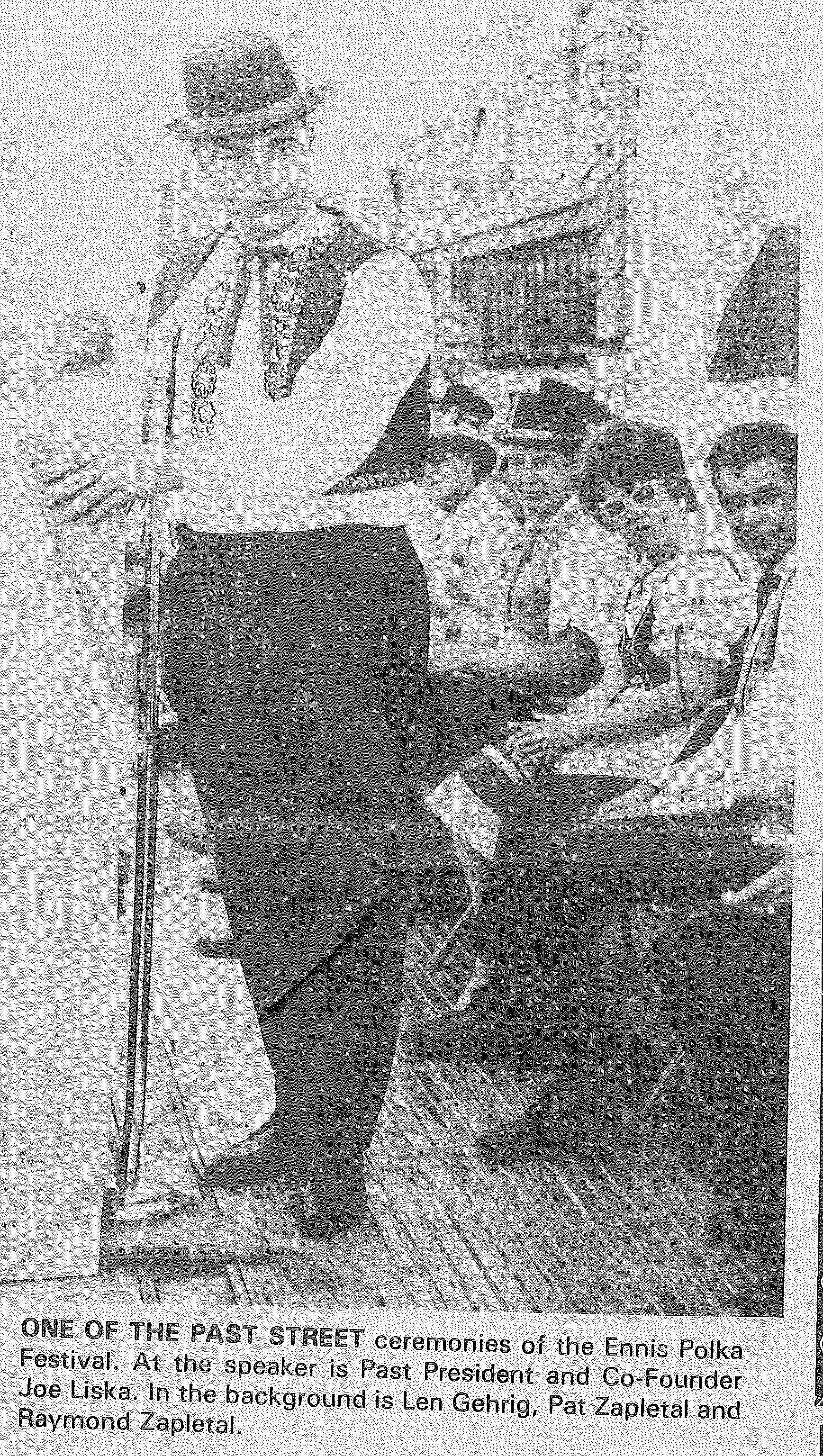
Joe Liska – Founder

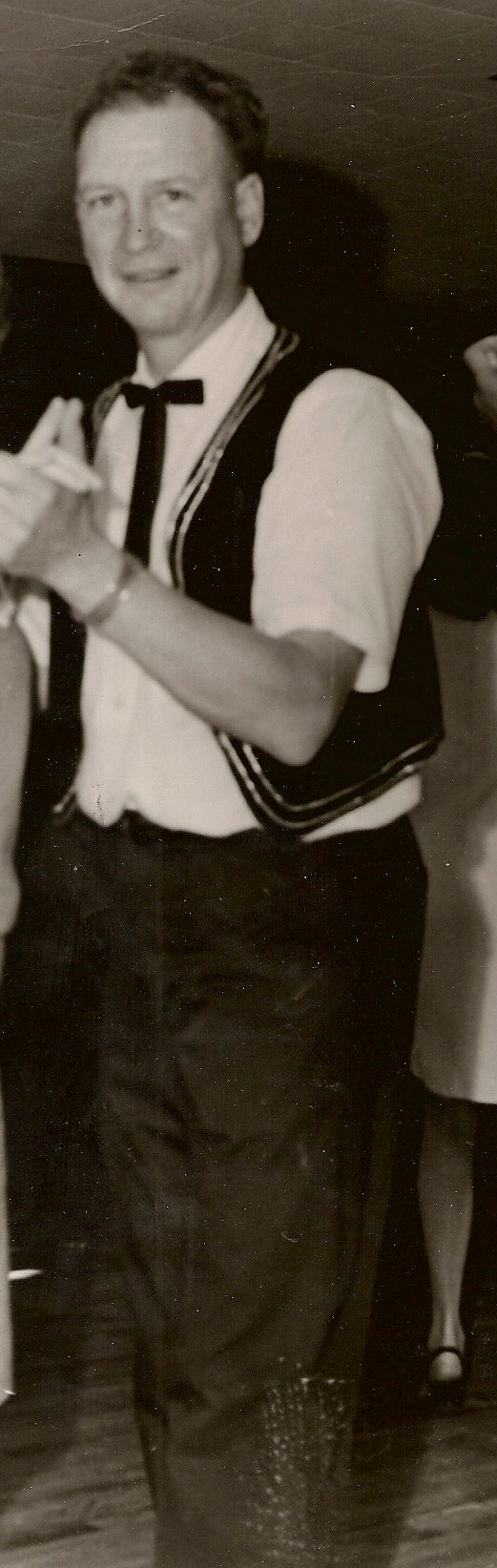
Len Gehrig – Founder
