= Kolach (cake) =

Small, usually sweet, type of sweet bread

Koláč
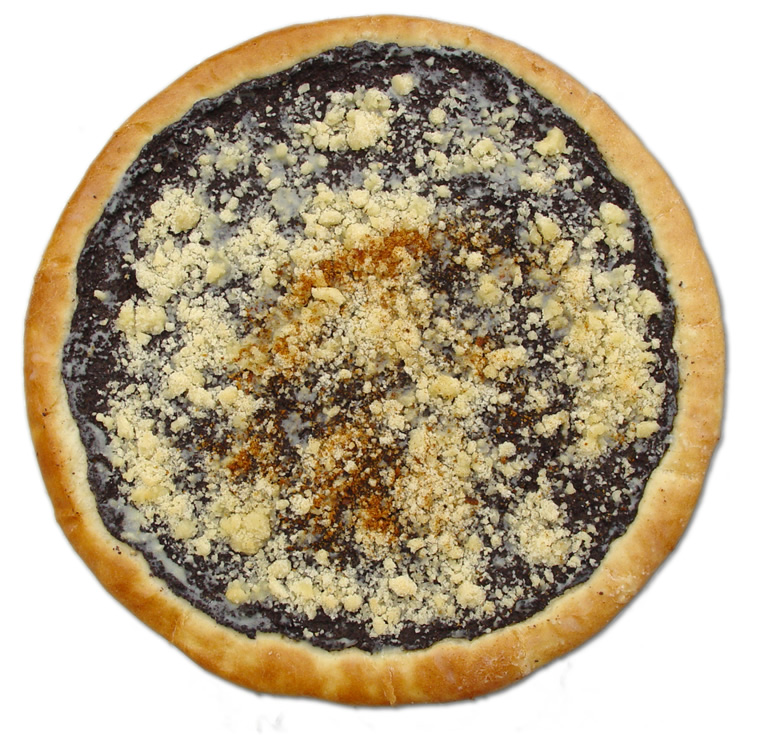
- Larger koláč, called "frgál", typical of the Moravian Wallachia area
- Type: Sweet bread
- Place of origin: Czech Republic and Slovakia
- Region or state: Central Europe

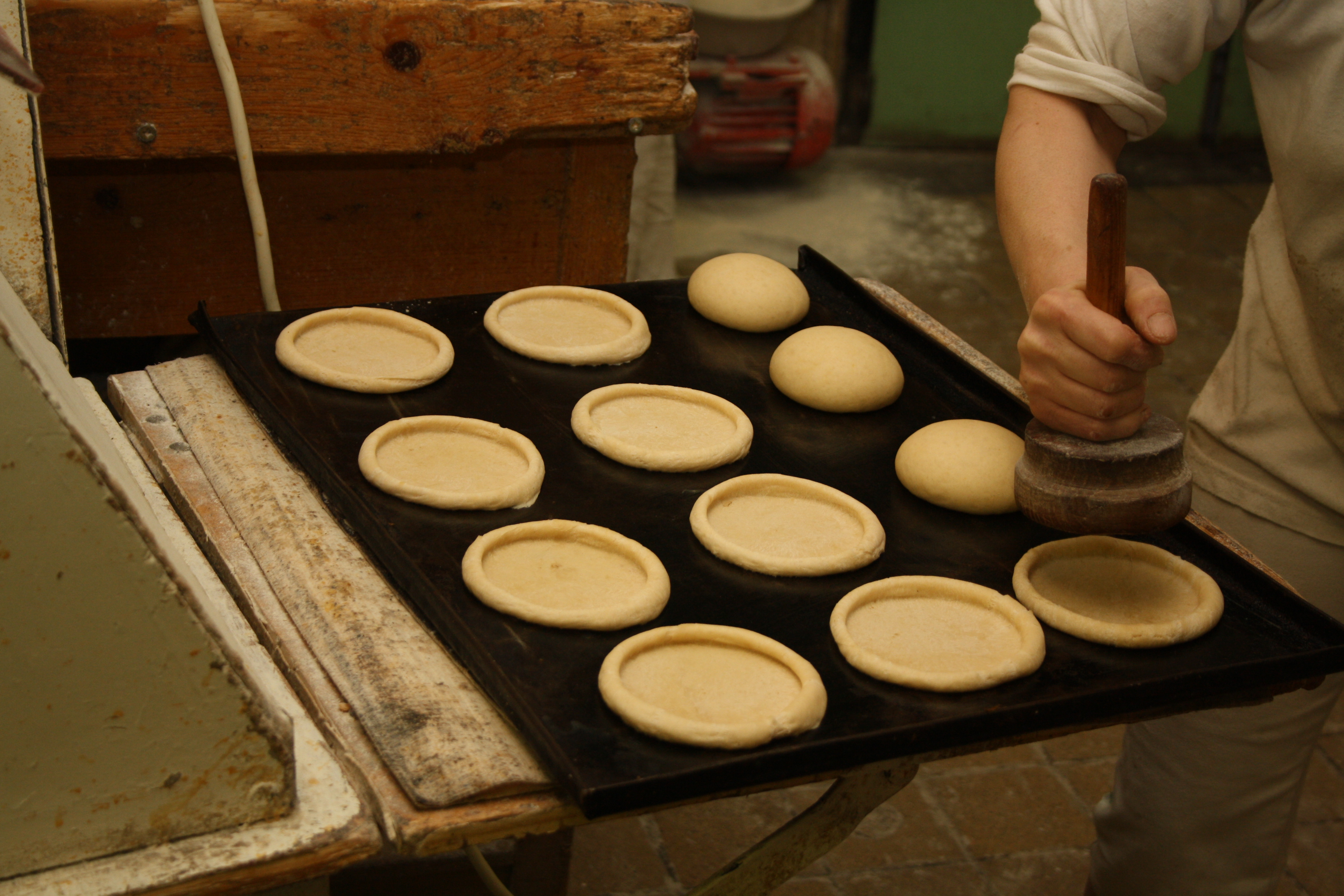
Koláč preparation in bakery

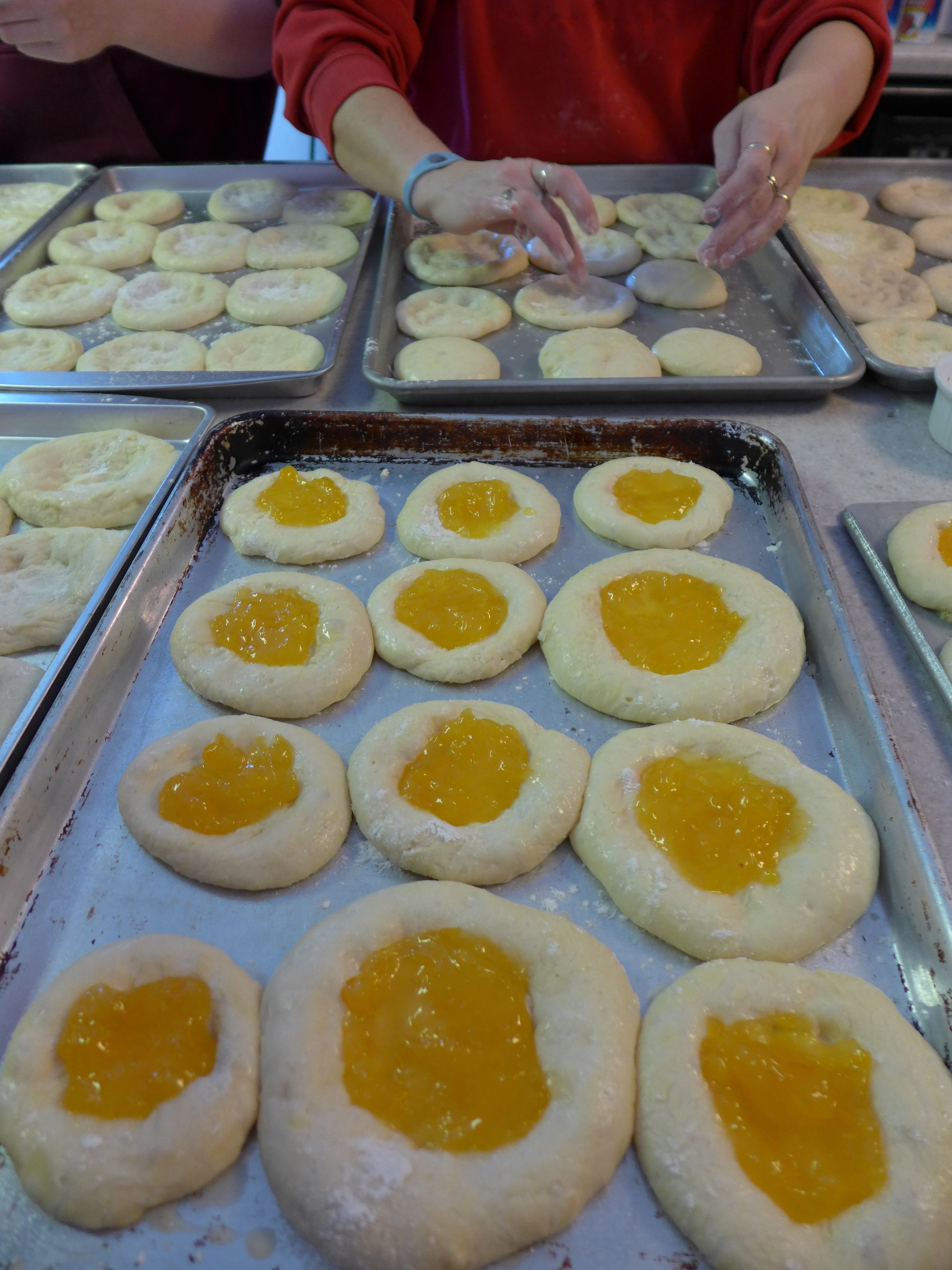
Making kolaches

A kolach, from the Czech and Slovak koláč (plural koláče, diminutive koláčky, meaning "cake/pie"), is a type of sweet bread that holds a portion of fruit surrounded by puffy yeast dough. Common filling flavors include tvaroh, fruit jam, poppy seeds, or povidla (prune jam). In the United States, the word kolache is sometimes used as the singular rather than as the plural, and the letter "s" is often added to the end of the word kolache to form "kolaches", which is a double plural.

== Background ==
Originating as a semisweet bread from Central Europe, kolache have become popular in parts of the United States. The name originates from Bohemian, originally Old Slavonic word kolo, meaning "circle" or "wheel".

Traditional Czech koláče are used in villages during feasts as a treat or at important events, such as weddings. They are usually small, with a diameter of no more than 8 cm (3.1 in) and with only one type of filling, sprinkled with sweet crumbs or sugar.

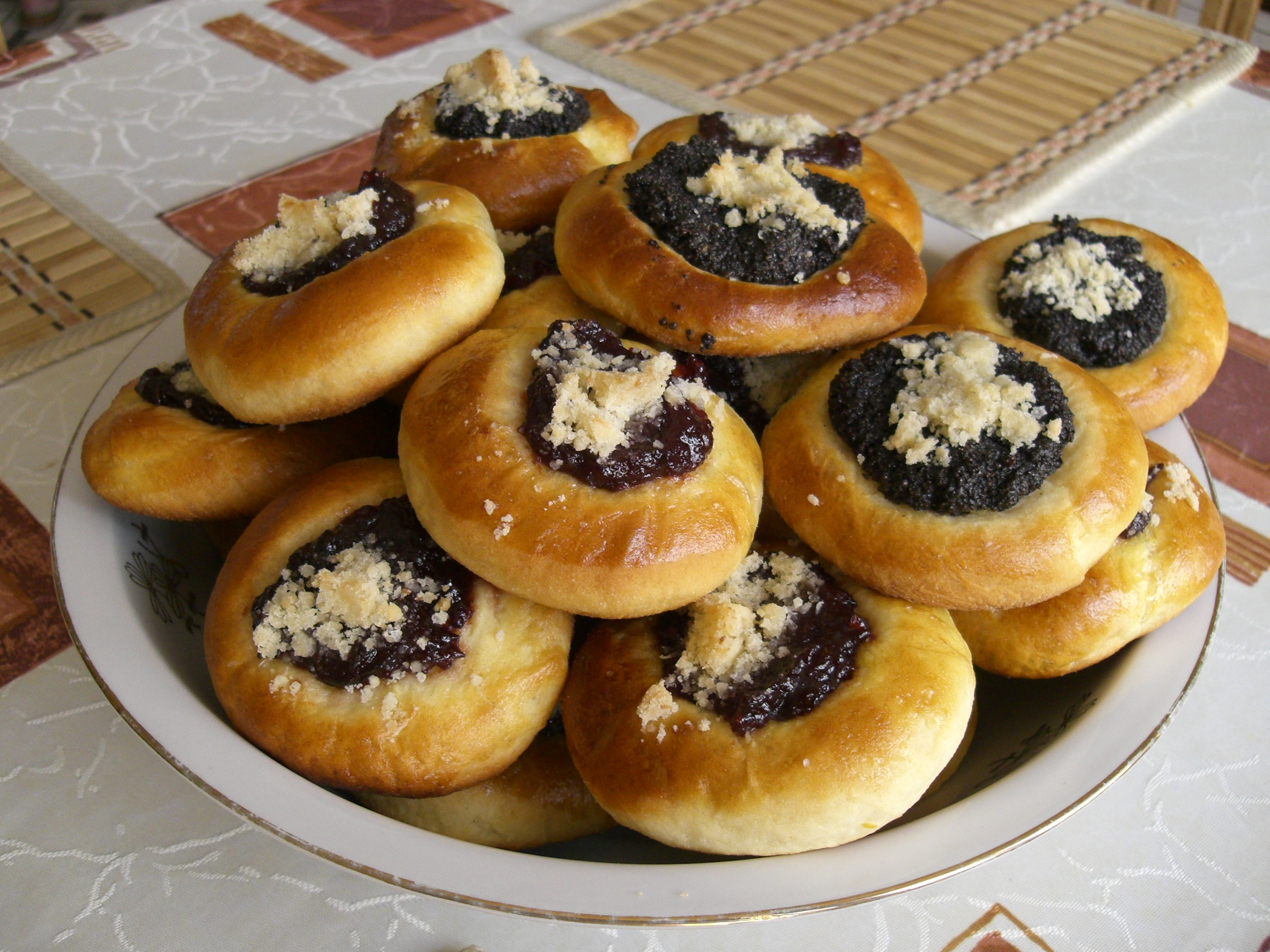
Koláčky

== Variants ==
=== Europe ===
In Moravia, large koláče are popular. In some areas, they have regional names: for example, in Wallachia, they bake so-called frgály, approximately 25 cm (9.8 in) in diameter. These are made of yeast dough and are most often filled with jam from apples, pears, or plums. In southern and western Bohemia (especially in the Chod region), koláče are also large in diameter and decorated with contrasting ornaments, most often made of povidla, poppy seeds, and cottage cheese. They are usually round in shape.

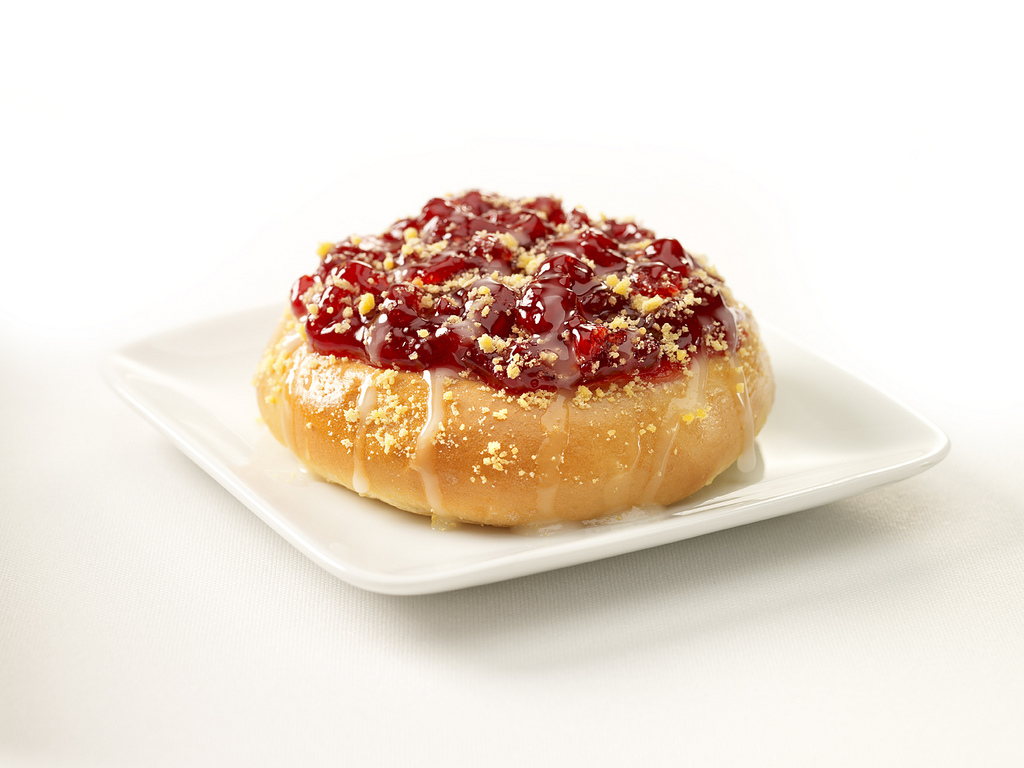
New York-style strawberry kolach

=== North America ===
In some parts of the US, especially in Texas, klobásník (or klobasnek), which contains sausage or other meat, is also called kolach, because the same kind of dough is used. This bread is more closely related to a pig in a blanket, however. In contrast, a Czech koláč is always sweet. Unlike kolache, which came to the United States with Czech immigrants, klobásníky were first made by Czechs who had settled in Texas. In Texas, kolaches are often known among people not of Czech origin as "sweet kolaches" or "fruit kolaches", while klobasneks are called kolaches.

Kolache are often associated with small towns in the midwestern United States, where they were introduced by Czech immigrants. They are served at church suppers and on holidays but also as an everyday comfort food. Recipes are usually passed down, with some including spices like mace or nutmeg. They can be filled with a combination of prune, apricot, cream cheese, poppy seed, or assorted other fillings.

In Minnesota, kolache are often folded dough pastries with a jam, cottage cheese, or poppy seed filling.

== Holidays and festivals ==
Bujanov, in the South Bohemian Region of the Czech Republic, holds annual koláč celebrations (Koláčové slavnosti) and a koláč marathon (Koláčový běh).

Several US cities hold annual koláč festival celebrations:

- Tabor, South Dakota
- Verdigre, Nebraska
- Wilber, Nebraska
- Prague, Nebraska
- Caldwell, Texas
- New Prague, Minnesota
- East Bernard, Texas
- Crosby, Texas
- Hallettsville, Texas
- Prague, Oklahoma
- St. Ludmila's Catholic church in Cedar Rapids, Iowa
- Kewaunee, Wisconsin

Both Verdigre, Nebraska, and Montgomery, Minnesota, claim to be the "kolache capital of the world". Prague, Nebraska, claims to be known as the home of the world's largest koláč. Both Caldwell, Texas, and West, Texas, claim the title of "Kolache Capital" of the state, and kolache are popular in Central and Eastern Texas. Various Texas-based food establishments have added sweet and savory kolaches to their menus. They are part of the "Texas Czech Belt", which grew in the 1880s and is full of koláč bakeries.

== See also ==
- Danish pastry, a laminated sweet pastry
- Koloocheh, Iranian pastry
- Vatrushka, East Slavic pastry
