= Bohemian Hall =

Bohemian Hall may refer to:

in the United States

- Bohemian National Hall at 321 East 73d Street on the Upper East Side, Manhattan, New York
- Bohemian Citizens' Benevolent Society, also known as Bohemian Hall and Park, in Astoria, Queens, New York
- Bohemian National Home, in Detroit, Michigan
- Czech Hall in Yukon, Oklahoma
- Z.C.B.J. Hall (Arthur, Wisconsin), also known as Bohemian Hall or Zapadni Cesko Bratrske Jednota Hall
- ZCBJ Lodge No. 46, in Prague, Oklahoma
- Z.C.B.J. Tolstoj Lodge No. 224 in Scio, Oregon

== See also ==
- Z.C.B.J. Hall (disambiguation)
