= Z.C.B.J. Hall =

Z.C.B.J. Hall may refer to any of several buildings associated with Zapadni Ceska Bratrska Jednota, including:

- ZCBJ Hall (Tyndall, South Dakota), listed on the National Register of Historic Places (NRHP)
- Z.C.B.J. Hall (Arthur, Wisconsin), NRHP-listed in Chippewa County
- ZCBJ Hall (Haugen, Wisconsin), NRHP-listed in Barron County

== See also ==
- List of Z.C.B.J. buildings
- Z.C.B.J. Opera House (disambiguation)
