= Rad Plzen cis. 9 Z.C.B.J. (SD10-6) =

- U.S. National Register of Historic Places
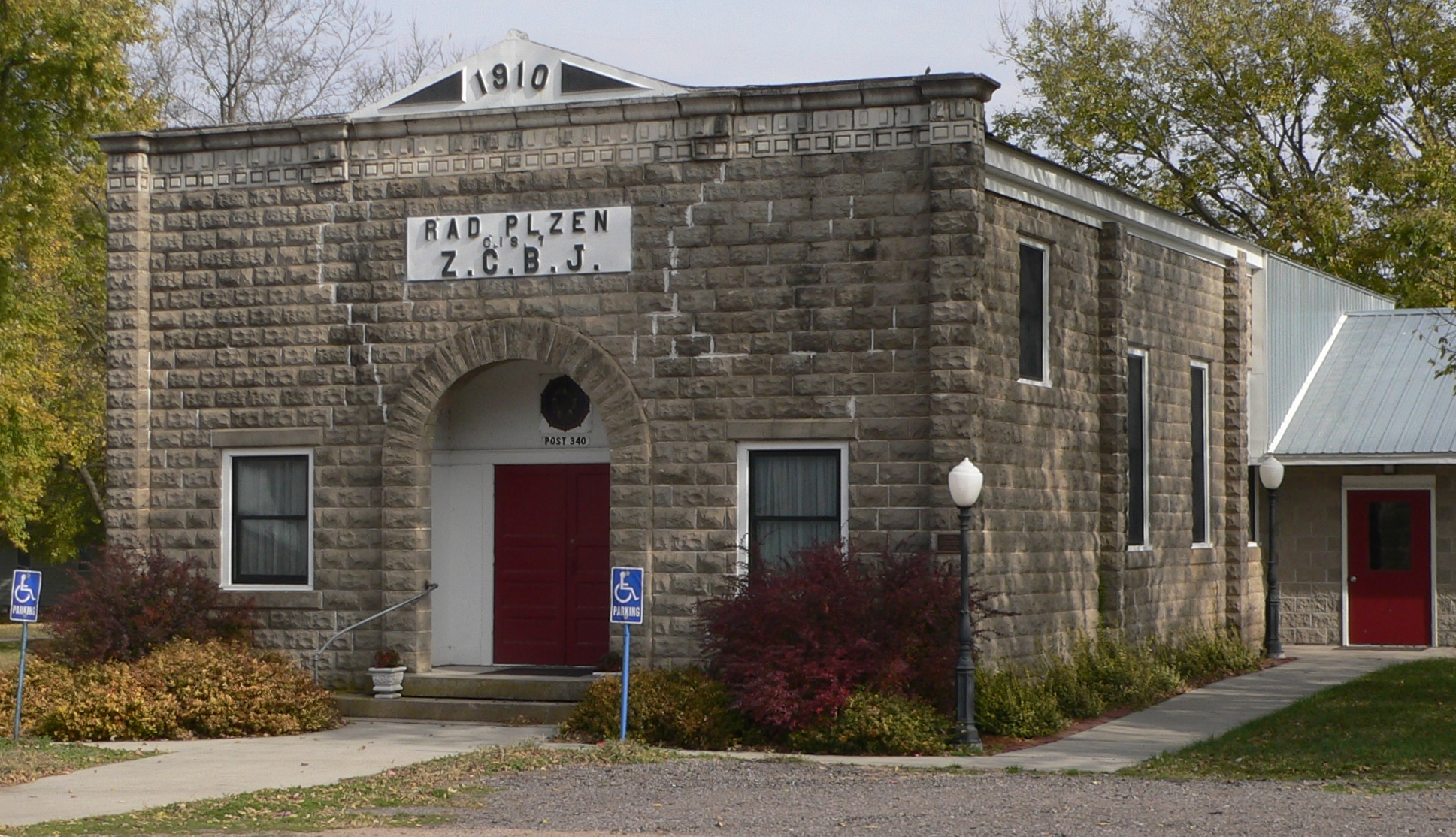
- Morse Bluff ZCBJ hall, now occupied by an American Legion post

- Location within Nebraska Location within the United States
- Location: Off Nebraska Highway 79, Morse Bluff, Nebraska
- Coordinates: 41°25′52″N 96°45′58″W
- Built: 1911
- Architect: Et al., Shavlik, J.P.
- Architectural style: Renaissance Revival
- NRHP reference No.: 86000440
- Added to NRHP: March 20, 1986

The Rad Plzen cis. 9 ZCBJ (SD10-6) is a building located in Morse Bluff, Nebraska that was built in 1911. It was listed on the National Register of Historic Places on March 20, 1986. The building historically served as a meeting hall for the Czech community. It was the meeting hall for the ZCBJ Lodge Plzen, a branch of the Zapadni Ceska Bratrska Jednota. The ZCBJ Lodge Plzen was originally organized on June 6, 1880 as a branch of the Czech-Slovak Protective Society, but was incorporated into ZCBJ in 1897.

The ZCBJ evolved into the Western Fraternal Life Association (WFLA). As membership in the Morse Bluff area declined, the organization found it increasingly difficult to maintain the hall. In 2001, the building was transferred to Morse Bluff American Legion Post 340; the WFLA retained the right to use the hall, as long as it continued to operate in the area. Beside Legion and WFLA activities, the hall is rented out for events such as wedding receptions, reunions, and graduation parties.
