= Rad Sladkovsky =

- U.S. National Register of Historic Places
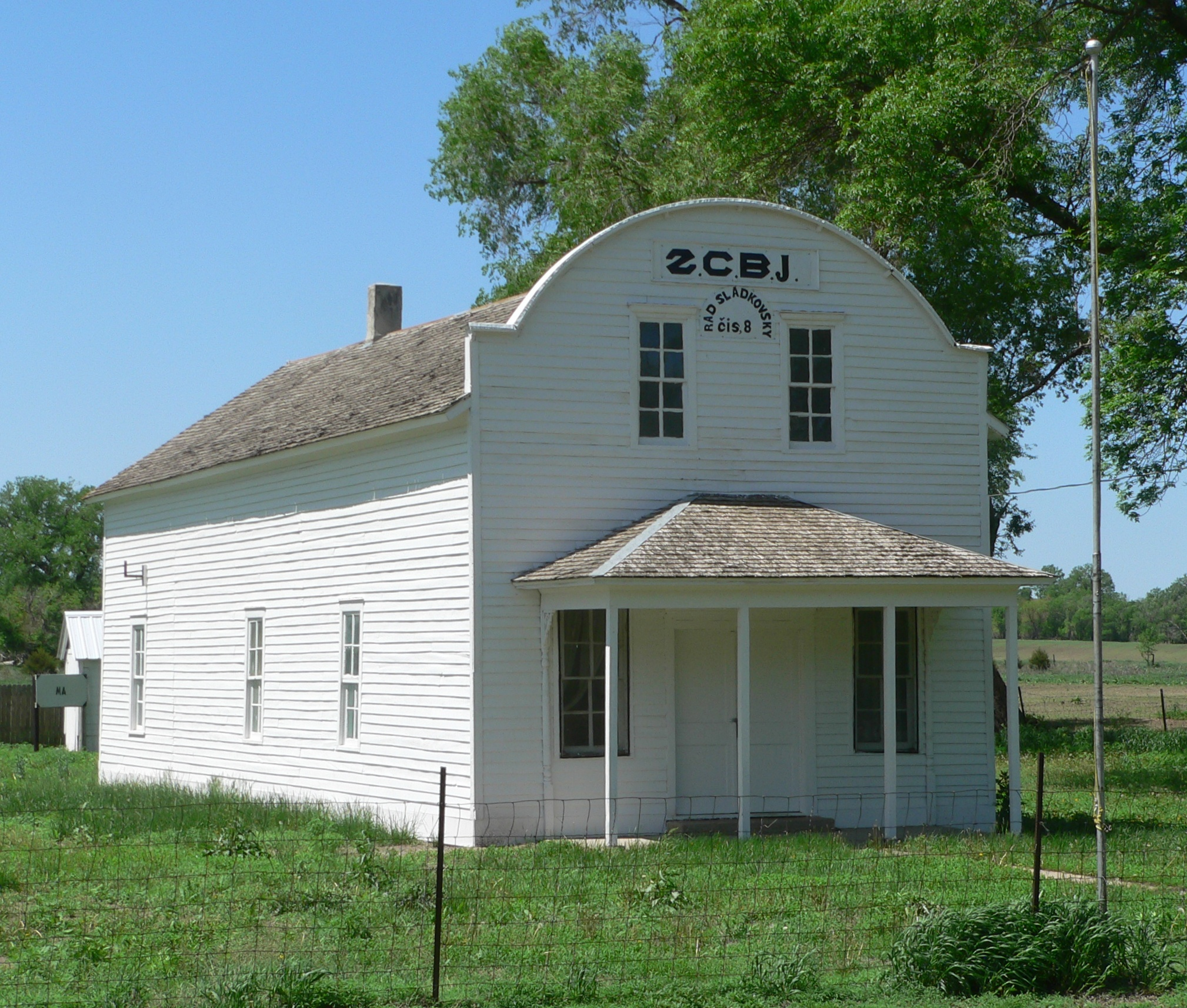
- Zapadni Ceska Bratrska Jednota (Western Fraternal Life Association) Hall in Pishelville, seen in 2013

- Location within Nebraska Location within the United States
- Location: Pishelville, northwest of Verdigre, Nebraska
- Coordinates: 42°43′34.28″N 98°12′41.47″W
- Built: 1884
- Architect: Hvizdalek, Vaclav
- NRHP reference No.: 82003193
- Added to NRHP: June 29, 1982

The Rad Sladkovsky lodge, also known as Pishelville Hall, is a building located near Verdigre, Nebraska that was built in 1884. It was listed on the National Register of Historic Places on June 29, 1982. The building historically served as a meeting hall for the Czech community, hosting a Zapadni Ceska Bratrska Jednota (ZCBJ) lodge that was the oldest Czech fraternal order in Nebraska. The lodge was originally organized as a branch of the Czech-Slovak Protective Society, but was incorporated into the ZCBJ in 1897.
