= Z.C.B.J. Opera House =

Z.C.B.J. Opera House may refer to:

- Z.C.B.J. Opera House (Clarkson, Nebraska), listed on the National Register of Historic Places in Colfax County, Nebraska
- Z.C.B.J. Opera House (Verdigre, Nebraska), listed on the National Register of Historic Places in Knox County, Nebraska

== See also ==
- List of Z.C.B.J. buildings
- ZCBJ Hall (disambiguation)
