= Rad Slavin cis. 112 Z.C.B.J. Hall =

- U.S. National Register of Historic Places
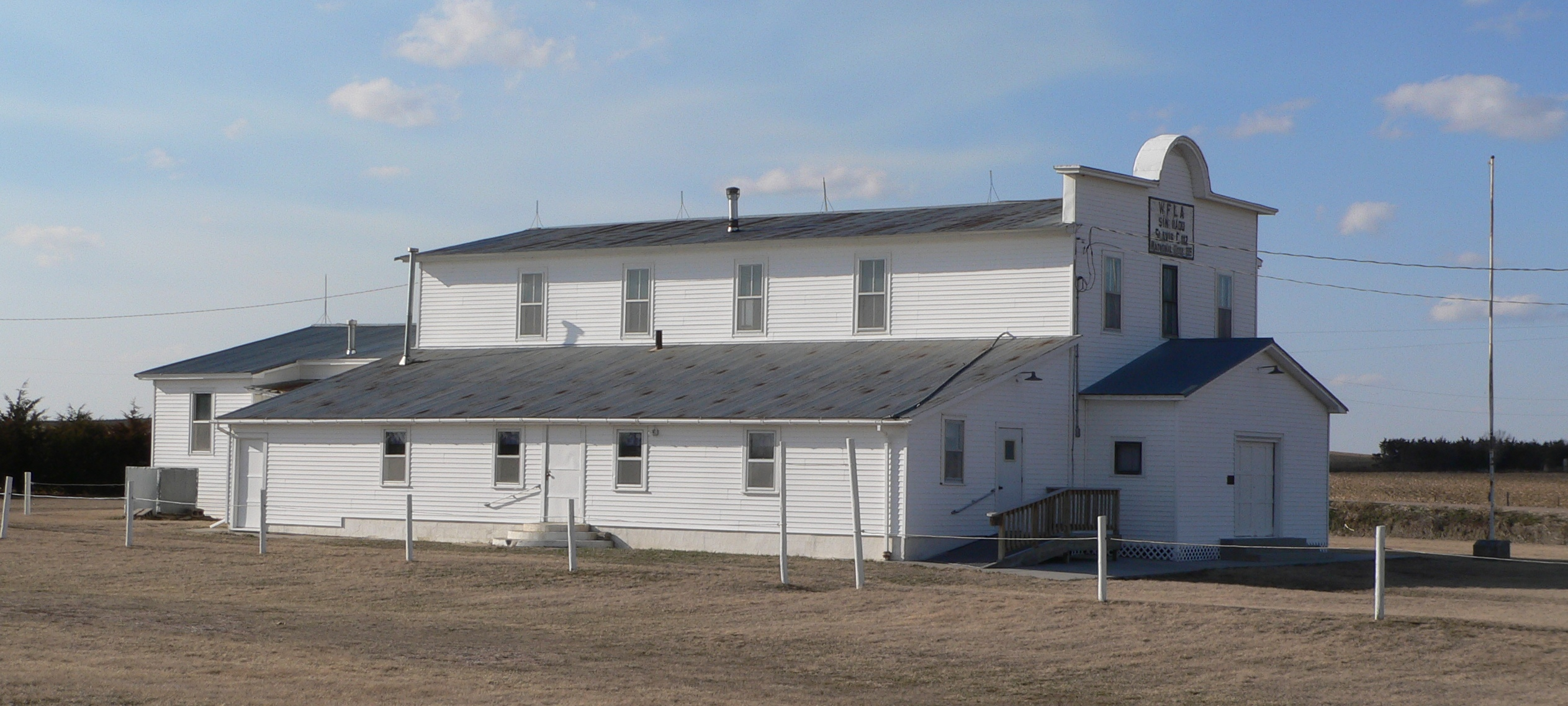

- Location within Nebraska Location within the United States
- Location: East of Comstock, Nebraska
- Coordinates: 41°36′36.4″N 99°9′19.8″W
- Area: 3.8 acres (1.5 ha)
- Built: 1909
- Architect: Anton Vanek et al.
- Architectural style: Baroque Revival
- NRHP reference No.: 92001569
- Added to NRHP: November 12, 1992

The Rad Slavin cis. 112 Z.C.B.J. Hall, also known as National Hall, is a building in Comstock, Nebraska, United States, that was built in 1909. It was listed on the National Register of Historic Places on November 12, 1992. It historically served as a meeting hall for the Czech community.

== See also ==
- Zapadni Ceska Bratrska Jednota
- Czech-Slovak Protective Society
