= Western Fraternal Life Association =

United States friendly society

- Zapadni Ceska Bratrska Jednota
- Established: 1897; 129 years ago
- Founded at: Omaha, Nebraska, United States
- Type: Mutual aid society
- Region served: United States
- Formerly called: Western Bohemian Fraternal Association

The Western Fraternal Life Association, previously known as Zapadni Ceska Bratrska Jednota (English: Western Bohemian Fraternal Association) is an American fraternal benefit society and financial services organization. The association has its roots in the Czech and Slovak immigrant community of the 19th century. It was once the second largest Czech-American freethought fraternity in the United States.

== History ==
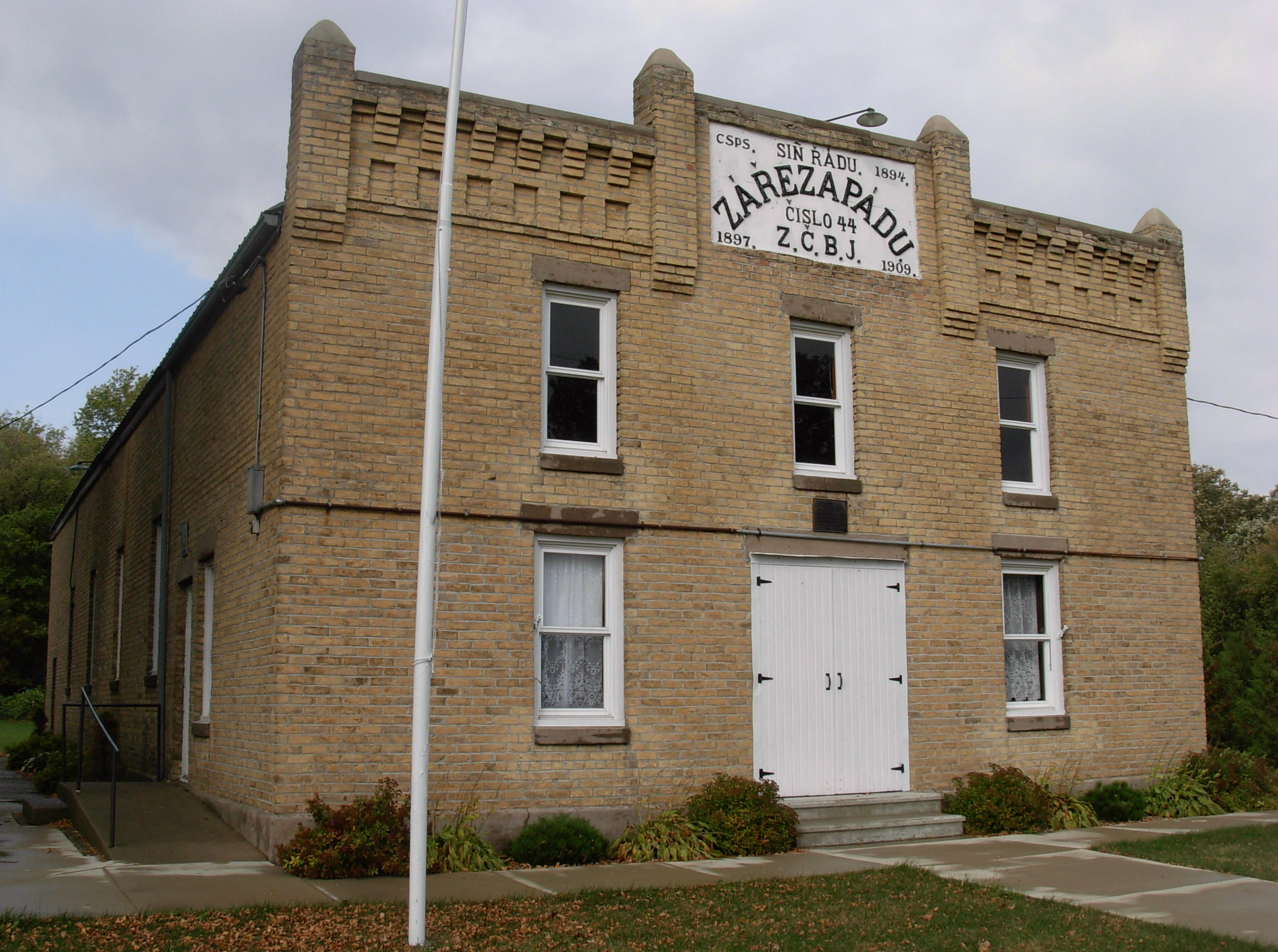
Lodge Zare Zapadu #44 in Freeborn County, Minnesota

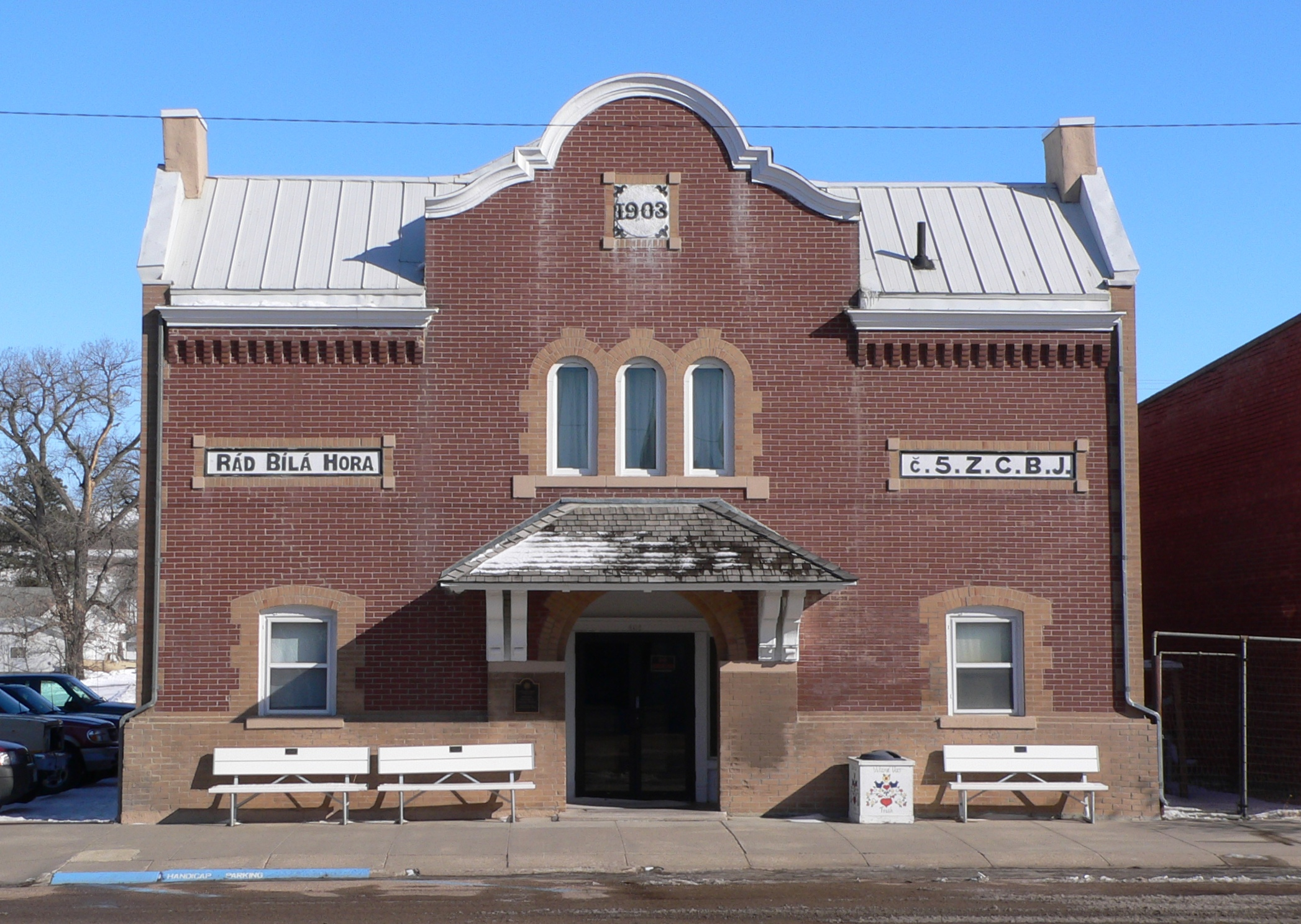
Z.C.B.J. Opera House, Verdigre, Nebraska

The association was established in 1897 in Omaha, Nebraska by immigrants from Bohemia, as the Western Bohemian Fraternal Association (Czech: Zapadni Ceska Bratrska Jednota; ZCBJ). The aim of the association, like other fraternal benefit societies, was to provide insurance and financial security for people from a similar demographic, in this case Czech immigrants to the United States, as well as protecting and promoting the Czech heritage of the members. The organization was a western offshoot of the Czech-Slovak Protective Society (CSPS), which was based in the eastern states. ZCBJ founder members disagreed with some CSPS policies which were not tailored to their specific circumstances, especially about the calculation of payments to members, and the admission of women to the club's services.

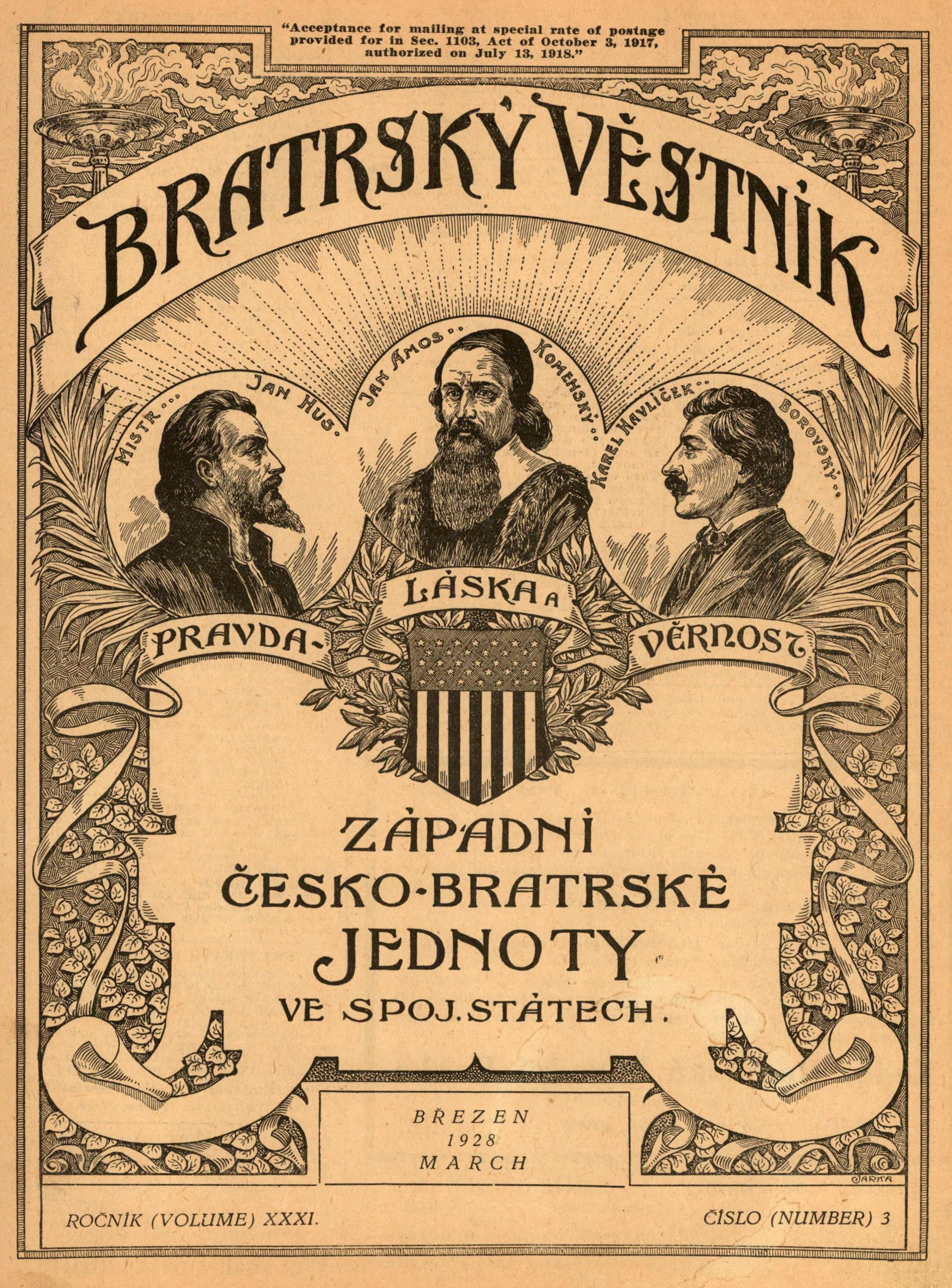
Bratrský Věstník (Fraternal Herald), published by the society from 1898 to 1920

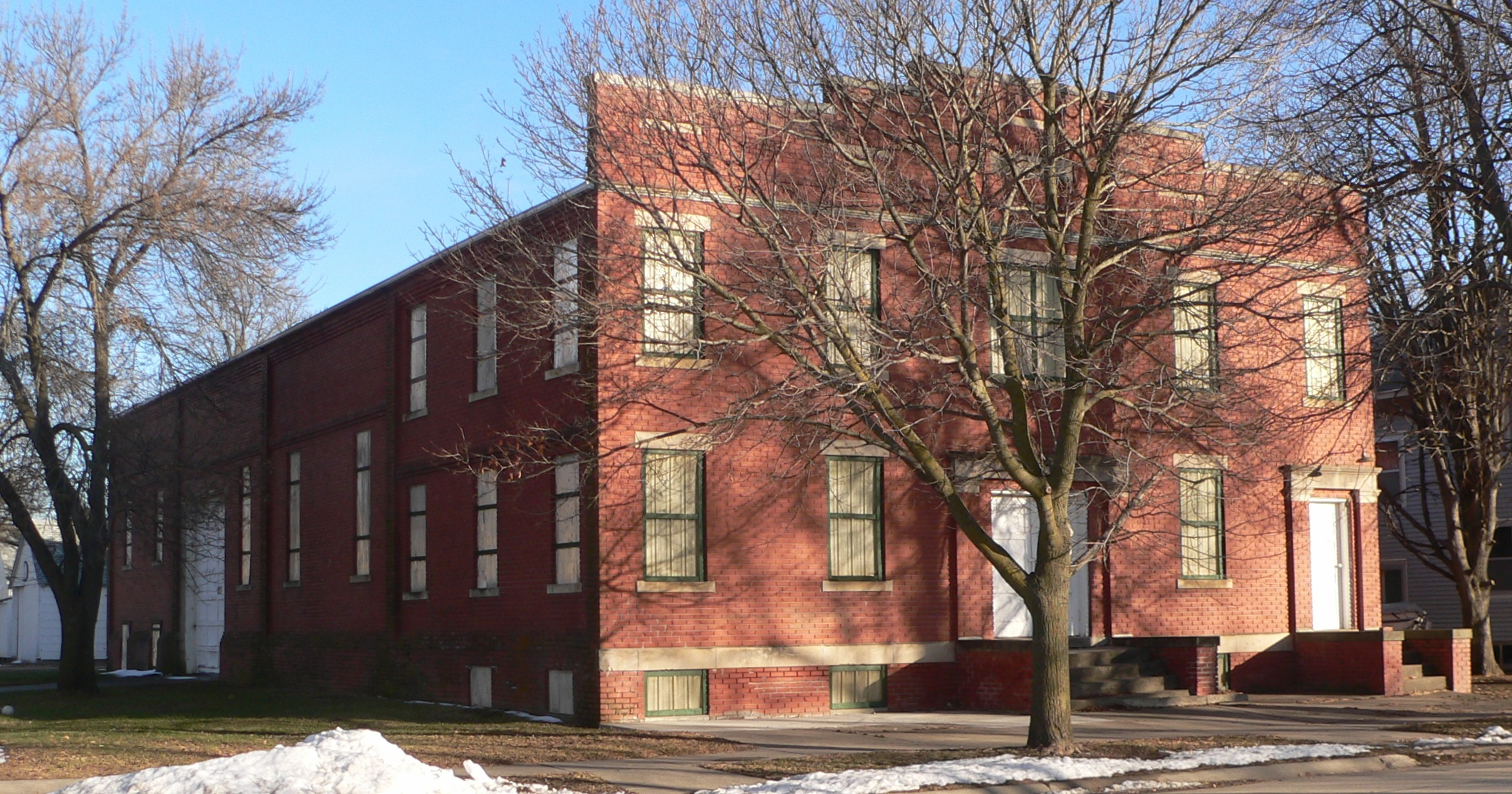
Cecho-Moravan Hall No. 68, Brainard, Nebraska

The motto of the society was "Truth, Love, and Loyalty", based on the purported values of the members and their community. In 1899, the association became one of the first fraternals to insure women. In 1919, members voted to insure juveniles. Membership was opened to all in 1947, and at the 1971 National Convention, members voted to change the name to the Western Fraternal Life Association.

Members created lodges in their areas to celebrate holidays, host plays and dances, and speak the Czech language. The lodges became a source of support and solidarity for members during difficult periods, such as the Great Depression and the World Wars.

As of December 2015, the association has more than 38,000 members from the states that Western is licensed in: California, Colorado, Illinois, Iowa, Kansas, Louisiana, Michigan, Minnesota, Nebraska, North Dakota, Ohio, Oklahoma, Oregon, South Dakota, Texas, Washington, and Wisconsin.

In 2021, the association merged with National Mutual Benefit to form BetterLife.

== Organization ==
The local units of the Association are called lodges, and the highest authority is the board of directors.

In 1923 the organisation's headquarters were at 307 12 Avenue, Cedar Rapids, Iowa.

== Historic buildings ==
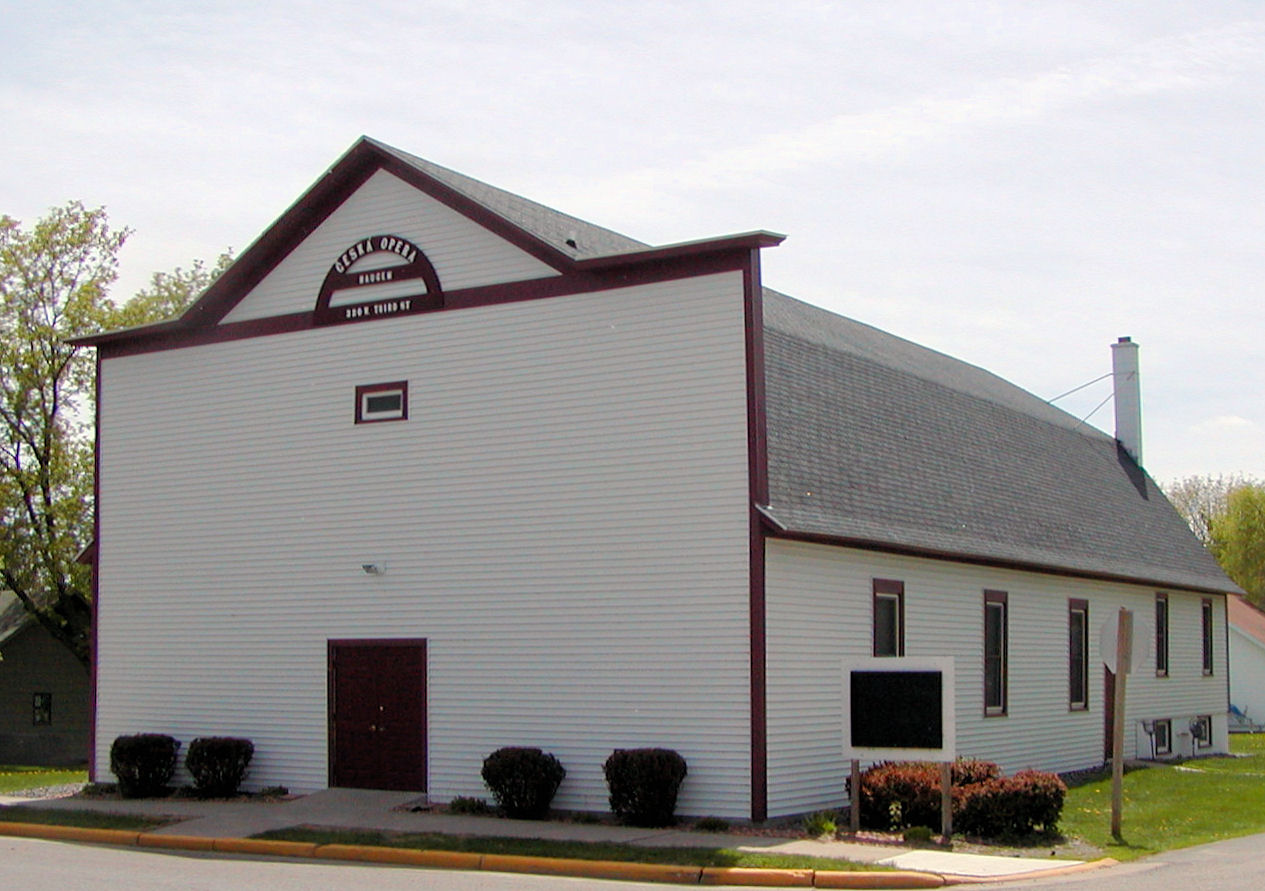
ZCBJ. Hall in Haugen, Wisconsin

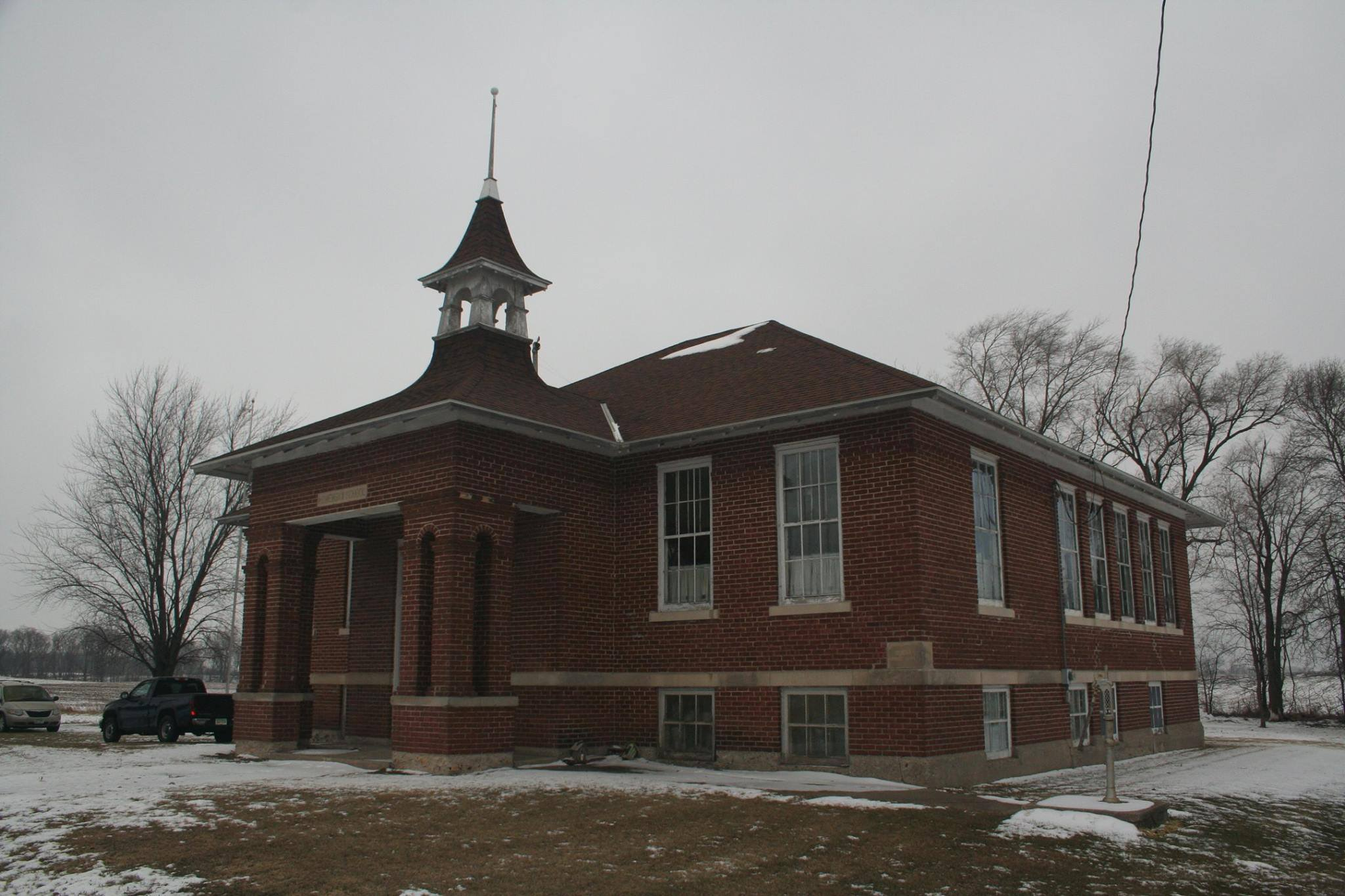
ZCBJ Lodge 34, Hutchinson, Minnesota

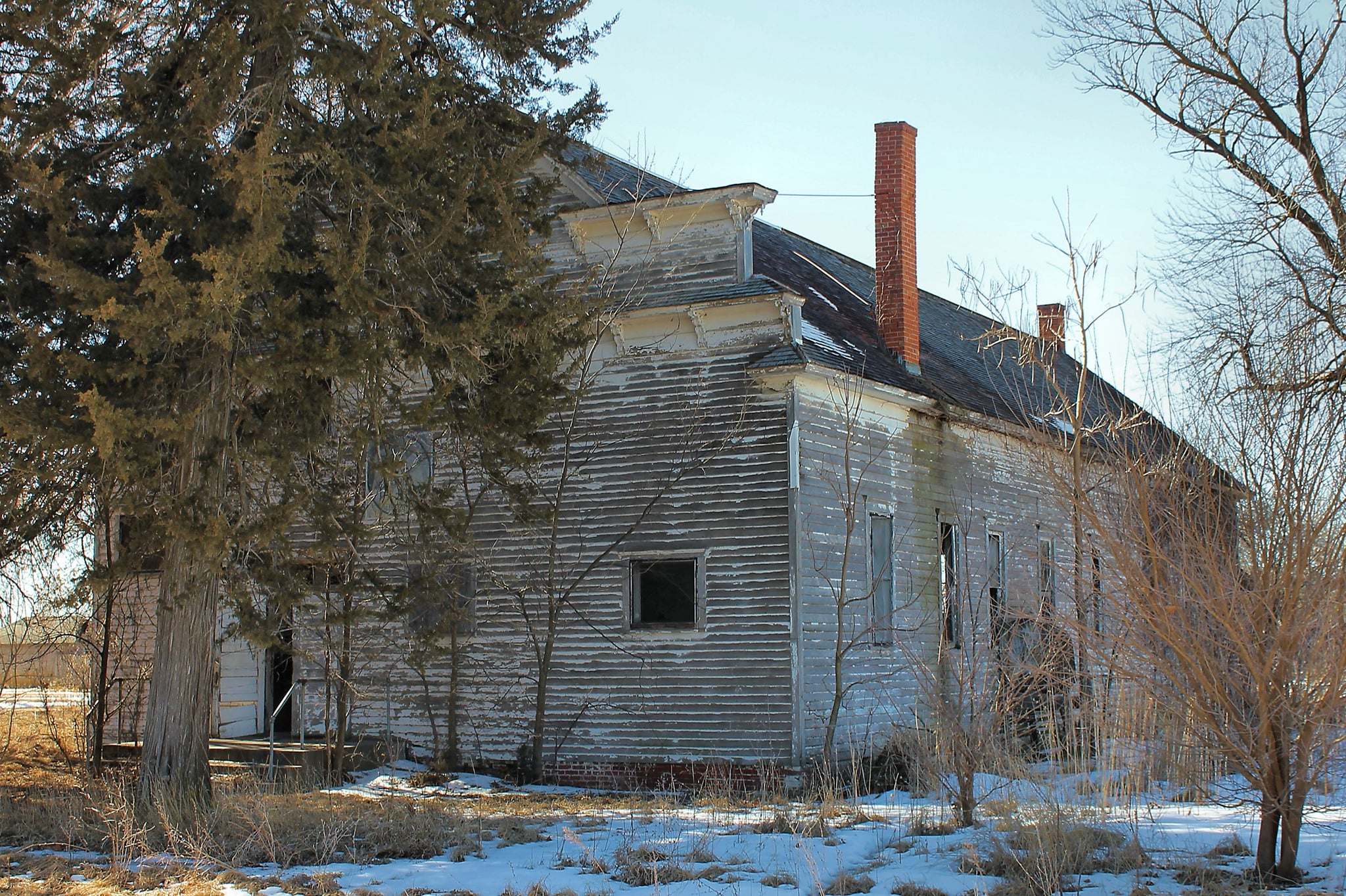
ZCBJ Lodge 31, Linwood, Nebraska

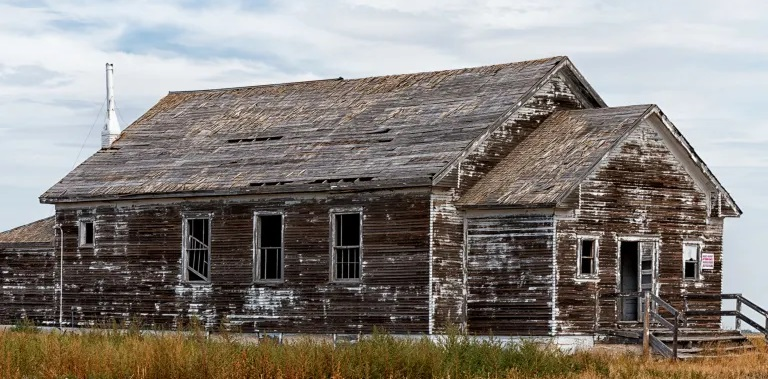
ZCBJ Hall, west of Hemingford, Nebraska

There are over a dozen historic buildings of the association which are listed on the U.S. National Register of Historic Places:

Notable lodges of the organization include:

- ZCBJ Opera House (1903), Verdigre, Nebraska, NRHP-listed.
- Z.C.B.J. Hall Lodge No. 141 (1907), Arthur, Wisconsin, NRHP-listed.
- ZCBJ Hall (1908), Tyndall, South Dakota, NRHP-listed.
- Rad Slavin cis. 112 Z.C.B.J. Hall (1909), Comstock, Nebraska, NRHP-listed.
- Lodge Zare Zapadu No. 44 (1909), Hayward Township in Freeborn County, Minnesota, NRHP-listed.
- ZCBJ Hall (1910), Haugen, Wisconsin, NRHP-listed.
- Rad Plzen cis. 9 Z.C.B.J. (SD10-6) (1911), Morse Bluff, Nebraska, NRHP-listed.
- Z.C.B.J. Tolstoj Lodge No. 224 (1911), in Scio, Oregon, on the bank of Thomas Creek, NRHP-listed.
- Z.C.B.J. Opera House (1913), Clarkson, Nebraska, NRHP-listed.
- Z.C.B.J. Rad Tabor No. 74 (1914), Dorchester, Nebraska, NRHP-listed.
- ZCBJ Lodge No. 46 (1917), Prague, Oklahoma, NRHP-listed.
- Rad Jan Kollar cis 101 Z.C.B.J. (1921), Du Bois, Nebraska, NRHP-listed.
- Western Bohemian Fraternal Union Hall (1925), Meadowlands, Minnesota, NRHP-listed.
- Rad Saline Center cis. 389 Z.C.B.J. (1939), Western, Nebraska, NRHP-listed.
- Lodge Boleslav Jablonsky No. 219, Poplar Grove Township, Minnesota, NRHP-listed.
- Rad Sladkovsky Z.C.B.J. No. 8, Pishelville, Nebraska
- Cesko-narodni sin-Milligan Auditorium, Milligan, Nebraska
- ZCBJ Lodge Ratolest Mladocechu No. 31 (1903), Linwood, Nebraska
- ZCBJ Hall, west of Hemingford, Nebraska
- Cecho-Moravan Hall No. 68, Brainard, Nebraska
- ZCBJ Lodge Lumír 34 Hutchinson, Minnesota

== See also ==
- Western Fraternal Life Association topics
- American Czech and Slovak Association
- Czech-Slovak Protective Society
- List of North American ethnic and religious fraternal orders
