= Rad Jan Kollar cis 101 Z.C.B.J. =

Historic place in Nebraska, United States

- U.S. National Register of Historic Places
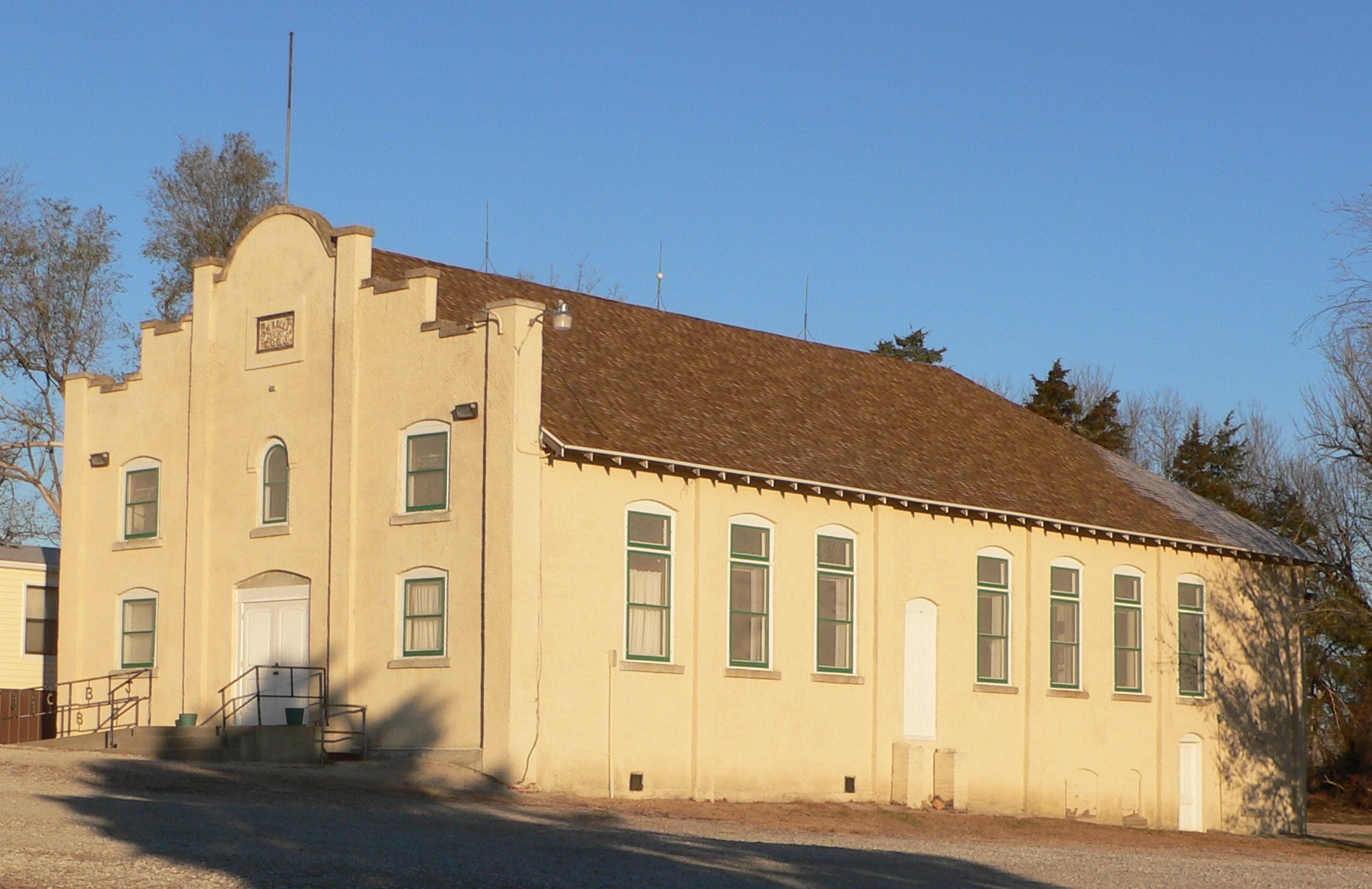

- Location within Nebraska Location within the United States
- Location: Address Restricted, Du Bois, Nebraska
- Coordinates: 40°3′32.5″N 96°3′44.4″W
- Area: 2 acres (0.81 ha)
- Built: 1920-21
- Architect: Hartung, Morris; Daniel, Frank
- Architectural style: Baroque Revival
- NRHP reference No.: 90000567
- Added to NRHP: April 5, 1990

The Rad Jan Kollar cis 101 Z.C.B.J., also known as Z.C.B.J. Hall, is a historic building near Du Bois, Nebraska, United States, that was built in 1920-21. It was listed on the National Register of Historic Places in 1990. It historically served as a meeting hall for the Czech community.

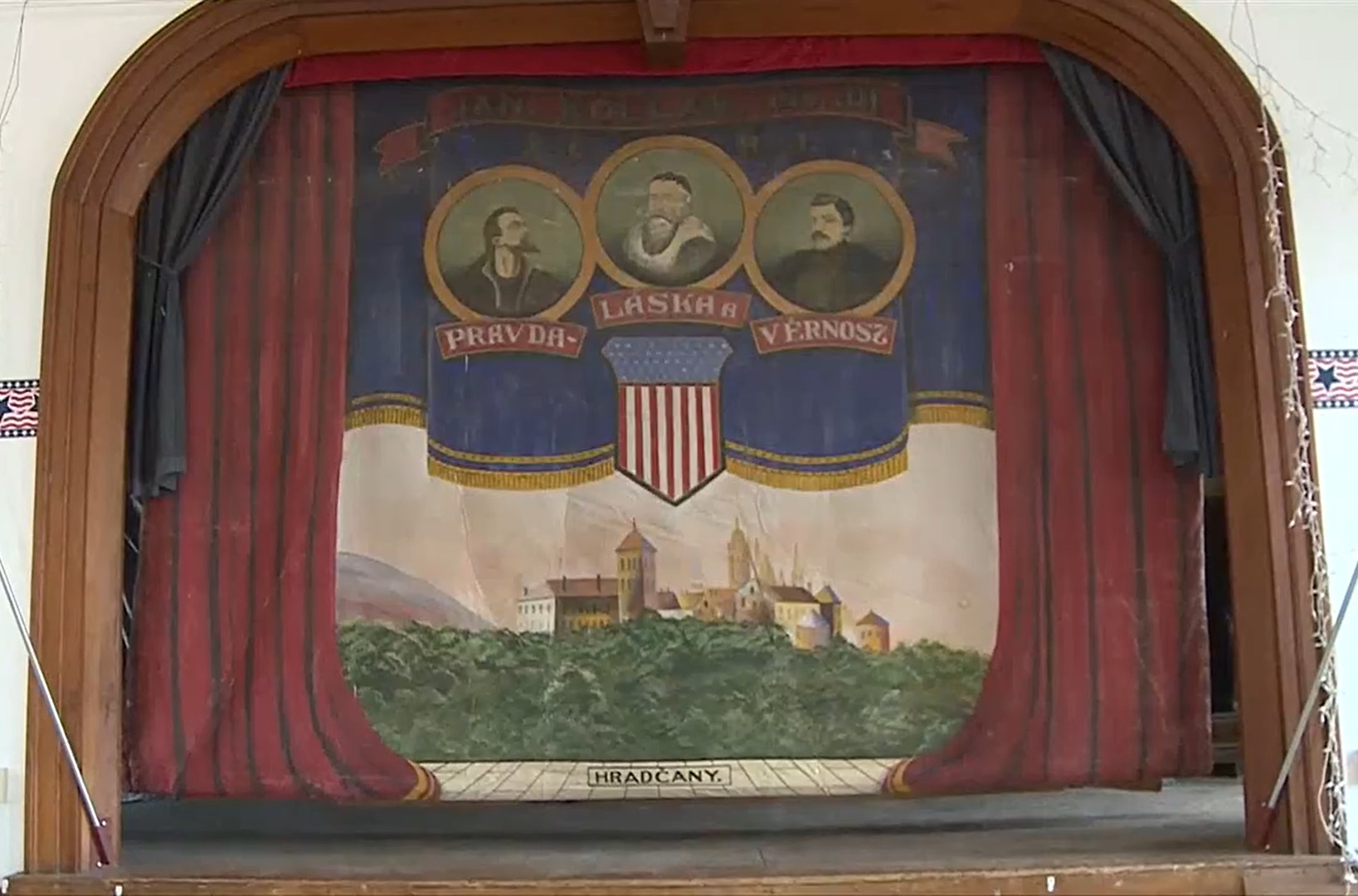
curtain Czech Hall

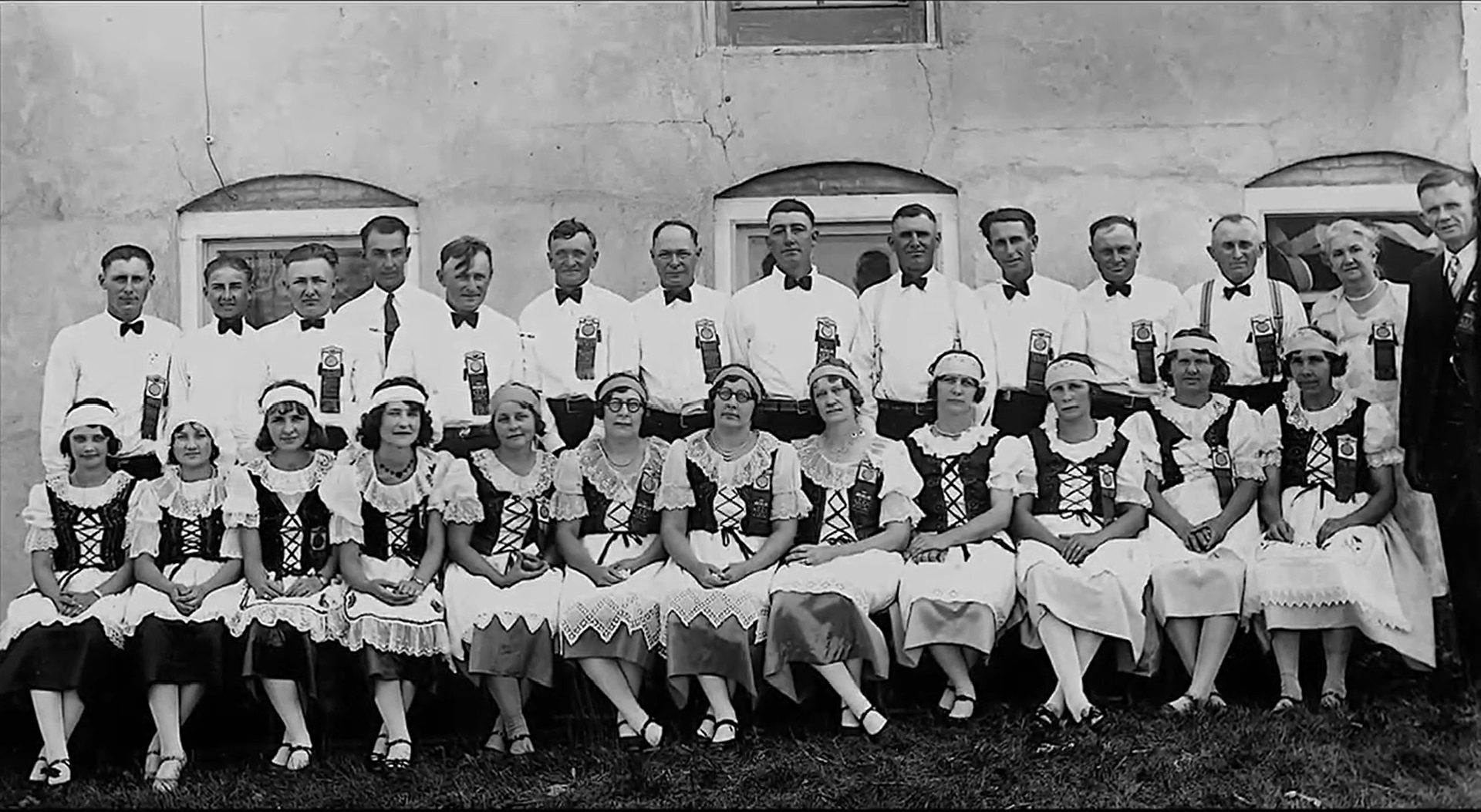
members ZCBJ 1922

== See also ==
- Zapadni Ceska Bratrska Jednota
- Czech-Slovak Protective Society
