= Z.C.B.J. Rad Tabor No. 74 =

- U.S. National Register of Historic Places
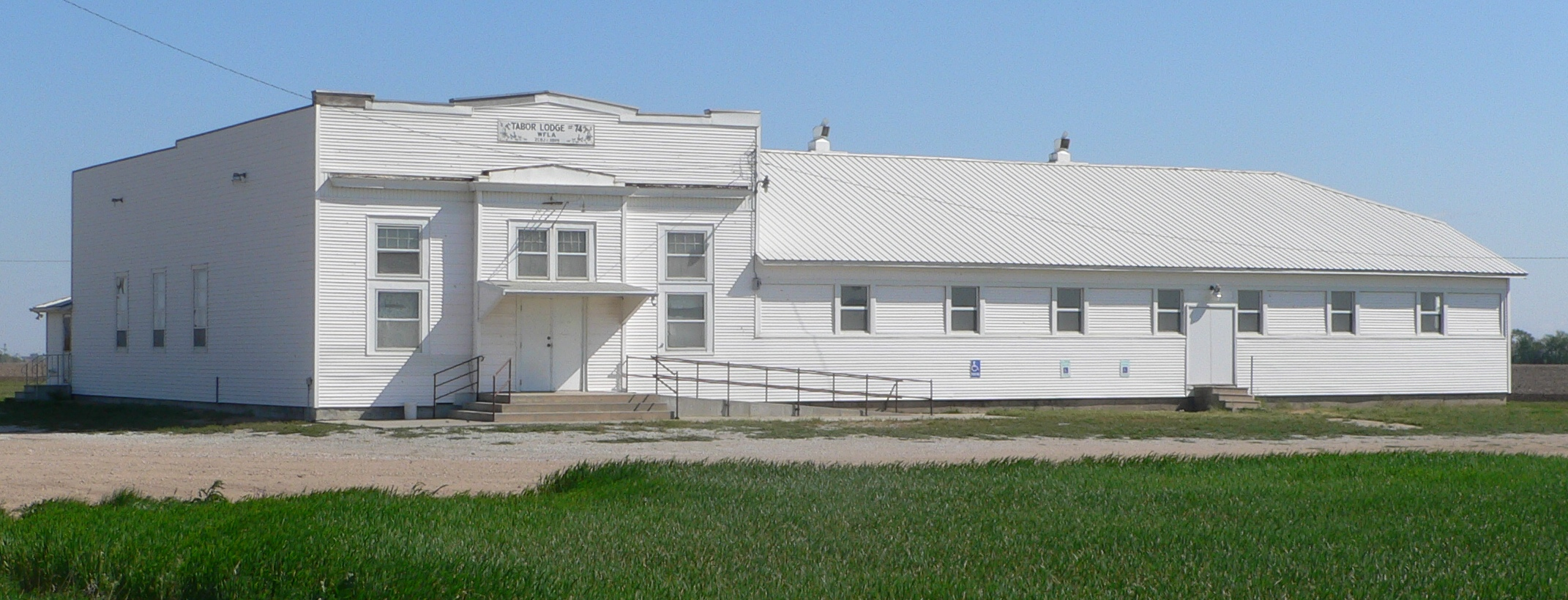
- Tabor Hall, seen from the southwest.

- Location within Nebraska Location within the United States
- Location: South of Dorchester, Nebraska
- Coordinates: 40°34′56.6″N 97°7′21.25″W
- Built: 1914
- NRHP reference No.: 85001798
- Added to NRHP: August 23, 1985

The Z.C.B.J. Rad Tabor No. 74, also known as Tabor Hall, is an historic building located south of Dorchester in rural Saline County, Nebraska. It was built in 1914; a large dance pavilion was added in 1934. It was listed on the National Register of Historic Places on August 23, 1985. It historically served as a meeting hall for the Czech community, hosting Czech language classes and Sokol events.

The dance pavilion is a 24.37 metres (80.0 ft) by 21.43 metres (70.3 ft) addition with a hipped roof with purlins. It is ventilated by a "unique system of six-paned casement windows and lap-sided panels which hinge horizontally".

== See also ==
- Zapadni Ceska Bratrska Jednota
- Czech-Slovak Protective Society
