= Z.C.B.J. Opera House (Verdigre, Nebraska) =

- U.S. National Register of Historic Places
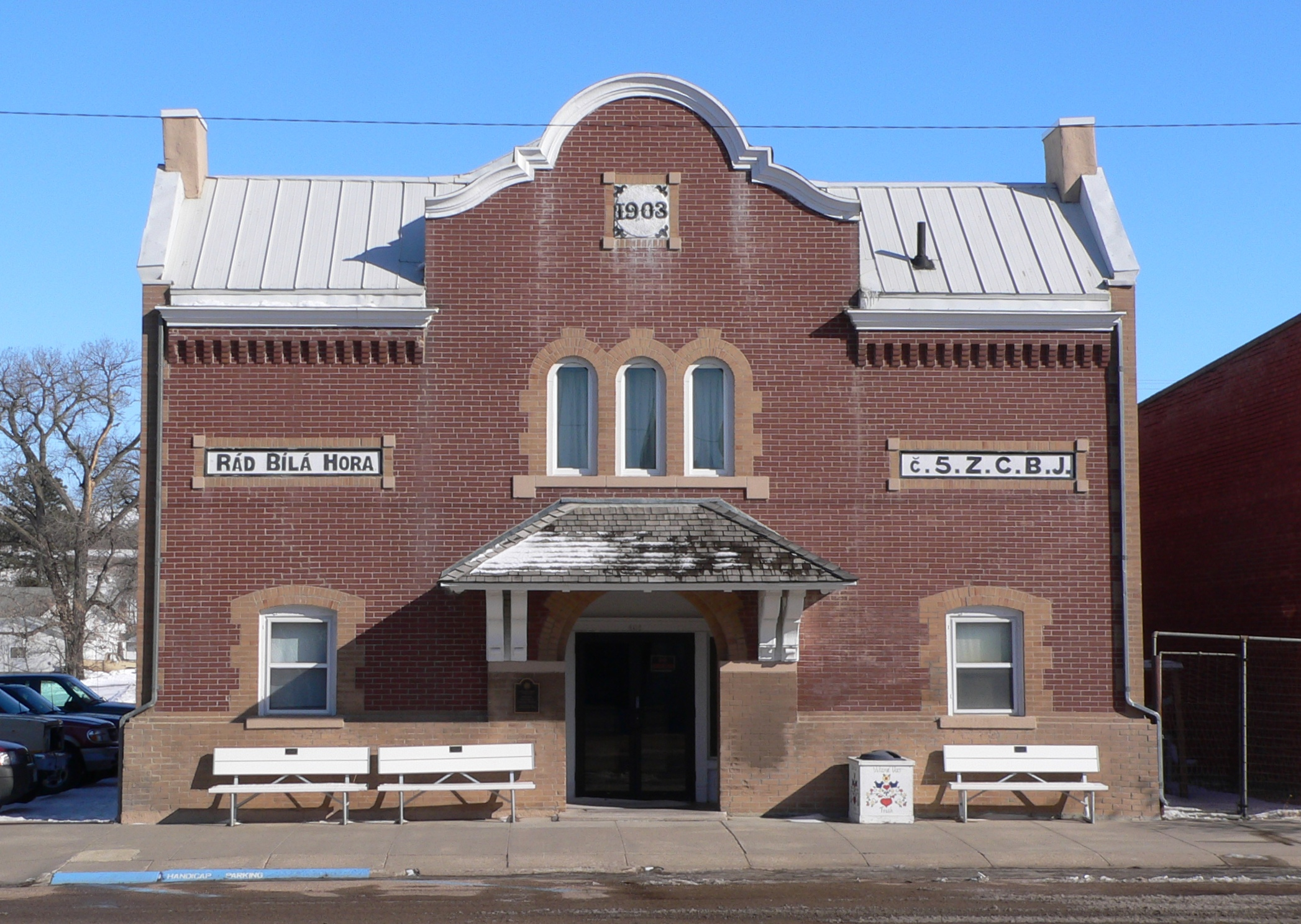

- Location within Nebraska Location within the United States
- Location: 4th Avenue and Main St., Verdigre, Nebraska
- Coordinates: 42°35′48.4″N 98°2′0″W
- Area: less than one acre
- Built: 1900
- Architectural style: Baroque architecture
- NRHP reference No.: 88000946
- Added to NRHP: May 16, 1988

The Z.C.B.J. Opera House is a building in Verdigre, Nebraska, United States, that was built in 1903. It was listed on the National Register of Historic Places in 1988. It serves as a meeting hall for the Czech community.

== See also ==
- Zapadni Ceska Bratrska Jednota
- Czech-Slovak Protective Society
