= Z.C.B.J. Hall (Arthur, Wisconsin) =

- Z. C. B. J. Hall
- U.S. National Register of Historic Places
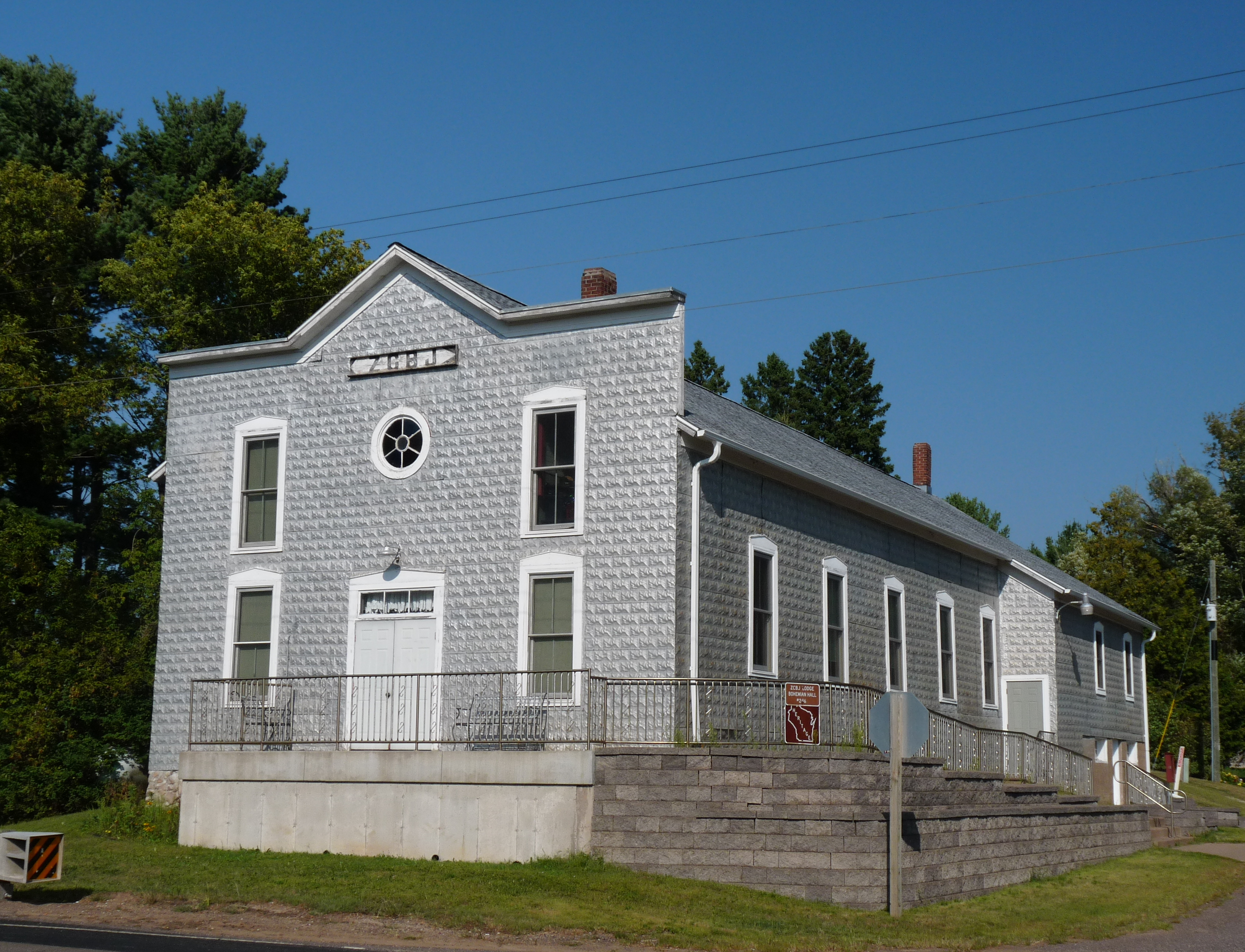

- Location within Wisconsin Location within the United States
- Location: Wisconsin Highway 27, 7 miles north of Cadott, Wisconsin
- Coordinates: 45°2′19″N 91°8′46″W
- Built: 1907
- NRHP reference No.: 92000812
- Added to NRHP: June 25, 1992

The Z. C. B. J. Hall, also known as Bohemian Hall or Zapadni Cesko Bratrske Jednota Hall, was built in 1907 in farm country north of Cadott, Wisconsin to serve as a meeting hall for the local Czech community. In 1992 the building was listed on the National Register of Historic Places.

In 1896, after most pine was logged off in the town of Arthur, the Cypreanson Brothers of Eau Claire offered cut-over land for sale and hired Vincent Benish to advertise that land in Czech-language newspapers to immigrants in southwest Wisconsin. Many of these people had left their homeland unhappy with Habsburg rule and its links to the Catholic Church. As a result, many were skeptical of the church and open to Marxist ideas and the Freethought movement. Still, they needed funerals and weddings, and a way to socialize with their fellow Czechs. In 1904 the Arthur Czech community organized a chapter of the Zapadni Ceska Bratrska Jednota - Western Bohemian Fraternal Association.

The main hall facing the stage

In 1907 the members built their hall. The original section was 60 feet by 32 feet with a false-front parapet. In 1913 a foldable stage was added for performances by the "Goodwill Actors," who traveled around the state, presenting several Czech plays each year. A Czech street scene was painted on one side of curtain panels with a forest on the back, for various settings.

In 1930 a semi-circular wooden stage and rear kitchen were added to the back of the building. A trapdoor at the front of the stage provides space for a prompter. In 1931 traveling artist Emil Piler painted a backdrop of the Karlstein Castle near Prague on a roll-down curtain. In front of that, a short curtain shows advertisements of local businesses. The building's exterior is sided with metal embossed to look like cement blocks and painted silver.

The kitchen

The hall hosted the weddings and funerals mentioned above, fraternal meetings, and all-night dances often led by local musicians. The organization lent money and provided insurance. From 1908 to 1934, the Czech language was taught in the summers. From 1928 to 1943 the hall hosted Sokol meetings, emphasizing gymnastics and patriotism with parallel bars, horizontal bars, rings, horse, marching, singing and folk dancing.

Meetings of the ZCBJ were held in Czech until 1946 - then switched to English. Many social activities were dropped during World War II as the focus shifted to supporting the Red Cross and local boys who were in the war.

In 1992 the hall was placed on the NRHP, significant as a focus of the local Czech community, and for helping them preserve their culture.

== See also ==
- ZCBJ Hall (Haugen, Wisconsin)
- Czech-Slovak Protective Society
