= Lodge Boleslav Jablonsky No. 219 =

- U.S. National Register of Historic Places
- Location within Minnesota Location within the United States
- Location: 30033 110th Street, Poplar Grove Township, Minnesota
- Coordinates: 48°33′20″N 95°56′58″W
- Area: 1 acre (0.40 ha)
- Built: 1916
- NRHP reference No.: 02000936
- Designated: September 6, 2002

Lodge Boleslav Jablonsky No. 219 is the meeting hall of a Czech American fraternal society in Poplar Grove Township, Minnesota, United States. The hall was built in 1916 and remains in use as of 2016. It was listed on the National Register of Historic Places in 2002 for its local significance in the themes of European ethnic heritage and social history. It was nominated for being a representative of ethnic history in the last part of Minnesota to be settled by Euro-Americans.

It is also been termed Z.C.B.J. Hall Lodge No. 219; it was a member of the Western Fraternal Life Association, also known as Zapadni Ceska Bratrska Jednota or Z.C.B.J.

== History ==
The Czechs who came to Roseau County, Minnesota, beginning in the 1890s were some of the first European Americans to homestead on land in northwest Minnesota. Czech fraternal lodges were created in America by immigrants to promote their welfare, maintain cultural traditions, and satisfy social needs. Lodge Boleslav Jablonsky was one such lodge.

Although Czechs are not one of Minnesota's larger ethnic groups, they were ranked seventh in 1910 with a population of 33,247. Nationwide and also in Minnesota, first- and second-generation Czechs pursued agricultural trades more than any other occupation in 1900. Czechs mainly lived in Le Sueur, Scott, and Rice counties in south-central Minnesota. There were smaller pockets of Czechs elsewhere in the state, including Poplar Township of Roseau County.

In contrast to the United States as a whole, in Minnesota most Czechs in rural areas were Catholic. However a large number of institutions were created by freethinking Czech Americans. The free-thought movement had its origins in Protestantism but could be best described as agnostic. These institutions promoted free-thought philosophy and maintained Czech language and culture. They also created social venues, benevolent societies, and cemeteries. Politically they supported the cause of Czech independence. The fraternal societies of which the Jablonsky lodge is an example were created to serve the needs of Czech immigrants that were normally met by churches.

The Jablonsky lodge was organized in 1914 to obtain life insurance at a reasonable cost and provide a gathering place where Czechs could speak their own language. The lodge was named for Boleslav Jablonský, a priest, poet, and Czech nationalist. Until the lodge hall was built in 1916, meetings were held in members' homes. The hall is a wood-frame structure on a poured concrete foundation with no basement. It is composed of three segments: an eight-square-foot (0.74 m^{2}) enclosed entrance porch on the south end, a three-bay hall, and a kitchen and stage at the north end.

The lodge was not militantly anti-clerical. A number of lodge members belonged to local churches, including St. Joseph's Catholic church, but that never caused a problem within the membership. The Czech fraternal societies provided benefits to Czechs on a local, national, and international scale. Aid was distributed to institutions in Chicago as well as Oklahoma, Kansas, and California. The lodge also provided support for Czechs in Europe during World War I and the crises of 1938–1939.

Lodge members sustained Czech language and culture by subscribing to a number of Czech-American publications. Plays in Czech were hosted at the lodge hall. Lodge meetings were conducted and recorded in Czech until 1960. Czech weddings and dances were also hosted by the lodge. Money for the lodge was earned through dues, concession sales, and facility rentals. The 1940s were the most prosperous decade for the lodge. Several improvements were made to the hall during that time.

The Czechs of Poplar Grove Township and their members elsewhere in Roseau County were never a large group of people. They did, however, show remarkable persistence. The lodge had thirty members in 1915 and about the same number in 1938. There were approximately ninety members between 1978 and 1995. The Badger lodge merged with Boleslav Jablonsky in 1996, bringing the total to 155 members.

Jablonsky Lodge hall has been in continuous use since 1916. Its main but not exclusive function in the 21st century has been to provide life insurance and related services. While there are about twenty Czech lodges in Minnesota, as of 2016 only two halls survive. The history of Jablonsky lodge provides insight into how one group sustained its identity and met its social, cultural, and recreational needs when no other suitable facilities were available in a remote area.

== See also ==
- National Register of Historic Places listings in Roseau County, Minnesota
