= Z.C.B.J. Tolstoj Lodge No. 224 =

- U.S. National Register of Historic Places
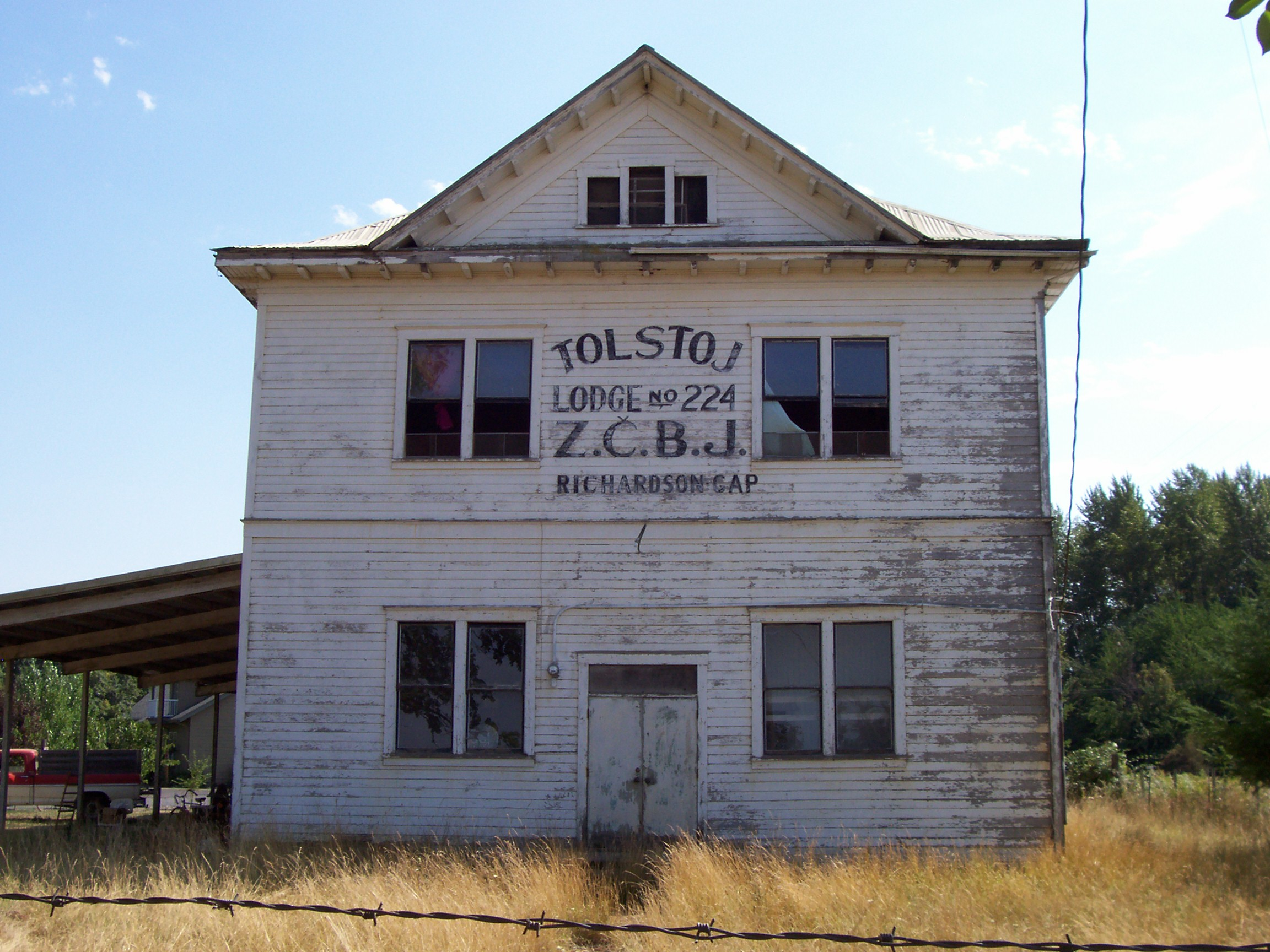

- Location within Oregon Location within the United States
- Location: 37091 Richardson Gap Rd., Scio, Oregon
- Coordinates: 44°39′37″N 122°48′10″W
- Built: 1911
- Architectural style: Vernacular Georgian Revival
- NRHP reference No.: 95001098
- Added to NRHP: September 14, 1995

The Z.C.B.J. Tolstoj Lodge No. 224, also known as Bohemian Hall or Tolstoj Sokol Lodge, is a historic building in rural Linn County southeast of Scio, Oregon, United States, that was built in 1911. It was listed on the National Register of Historic Places on September 14, 1995. It historically served as a meeting hall for the Czech community. The lodge organized a Czech school, in addition to hosting concerts, dances, Sokol events and Fourth of July celebrations.

The building is on Richardson Gap Road, which is named for a gap between Franklin Butte and Rodgers Mountain that separates the valleys of Thomas and Crabtree creeks.

== See also ==
- Zapadni Ceska Bratrska Jednota
- Czech-Slovak Protective Society
