= Narodni Sin =

- U.S. National Register of Historic Places
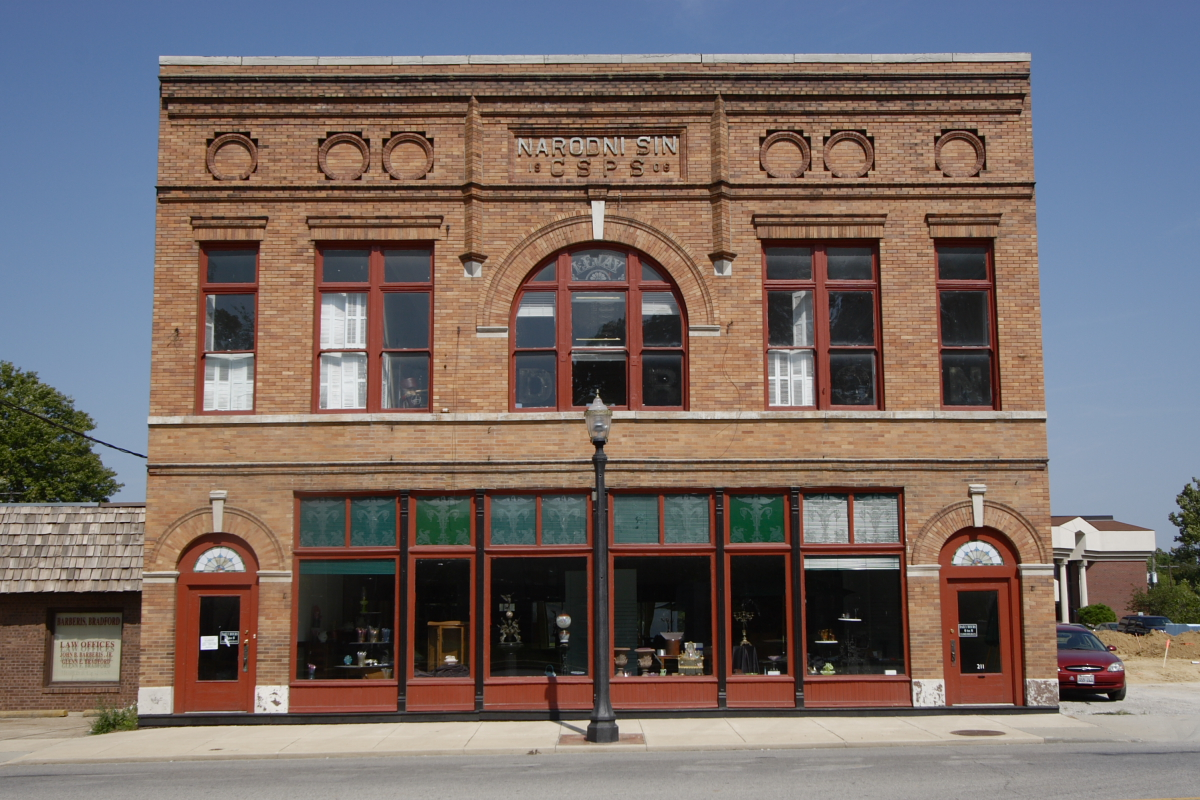
- Narodni Sin
- Location: Edwardsville, IL
- Coordinates: 38.81181°N 89.95387°W
- Built: 1906
- Architect: Hlad, Joseph Sr., Hlad, Anton
- Architectural style: Late 19th And Early 20th Century American Movements
- NRHP reference No.: 02001353
- Added to NRHP: 2002

Narodni Sin (Czech: Národní síň), also known as the Czech National Hall, is located on 209-211 E. Vandalia Street, Edwardsville, Illinois. Narodni Sin was built in 1906 using funds provided by the Czechoslovak Protective Society after they outgrew their original meeting hall. The building supported the society's cultural and physical fitness activities. They sold the building in 1971 to the builder's granddaughter who refurbished it and leased it for commercial use.

The building was listed on the National Register of Historic Places in 2002. It currently houses a paintball and airsoft supply shop called Bing Shop.
