= ZCBJ Lodge No. 46 =

- U.S. National Register of Historic Places
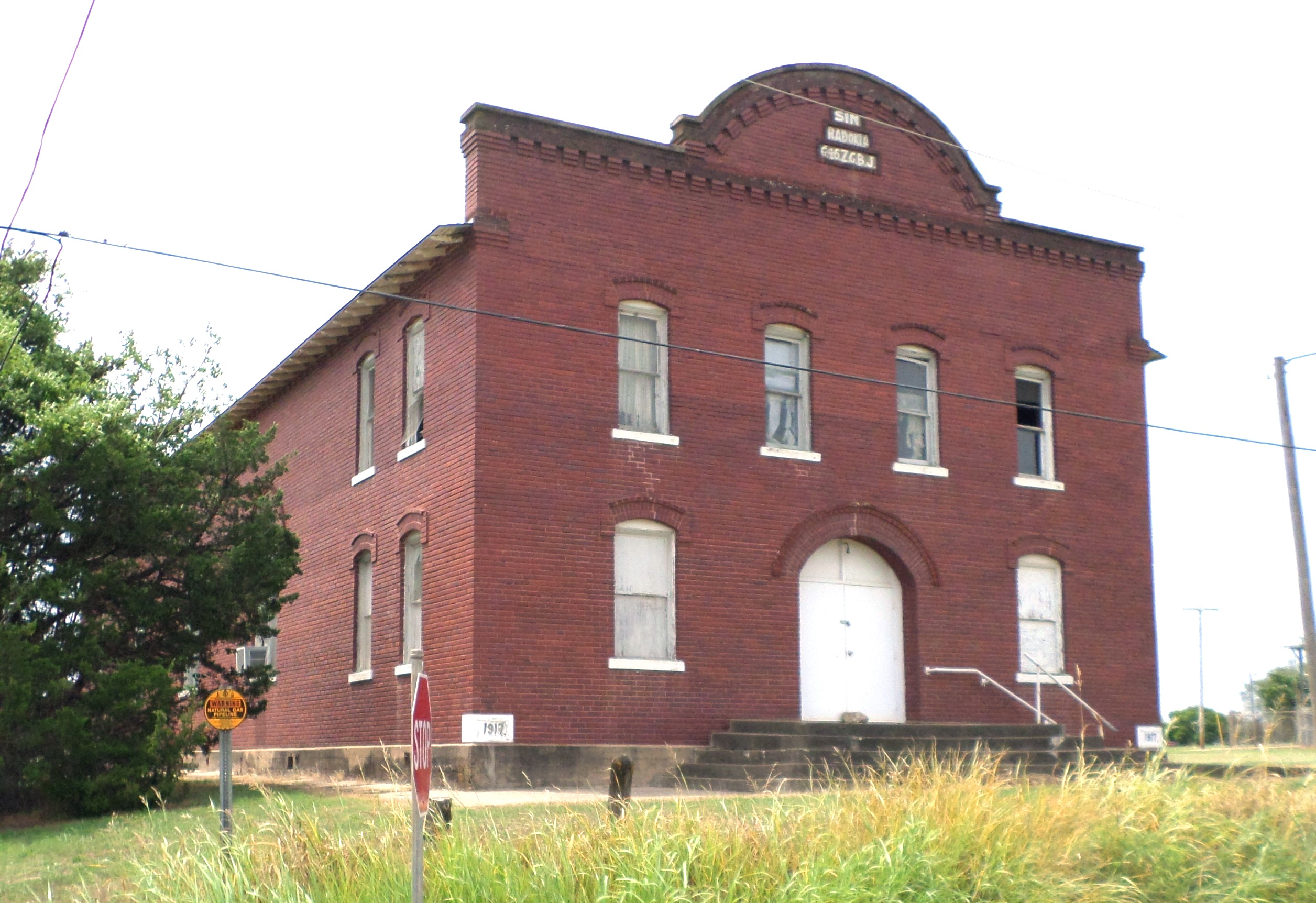
- Bohemian Hall in July 2020

- Location within Oklahoma Location within the United States
- Location: South Barta Avenue, Prague, Oklahoma
- Coordinates: 35.4775°N 96.6836°W
- Built: 1917
- NRHP reference No.: 84003138
- Added to NRHP: March 8, 1984

The ZCBJ Lodge No. 46, also known as Bohemian Hall, is an historic building located in Prague, Oklahoma, United States, that was built in 1917. It was listed on the National Register of Historic Places on March 8, 1984. The building historically served as a meeting hall for the Czech community, hosting a Zapadni Ceska Bratrska Jednota lodge that was the oldest Czech fraternal order in Oklahoma. The lodge was originally organized in 1891 as a branch of the Czech-Slovak Protective Society, but was incorporated into Zapadni Ceska Bratrska Jednota in 1897.

== See also ==
- Czech Hall
