= Lodge Zare Zapadu =

- Lodge Zare Zapadu #44
- U.S. National Register of Historic Places
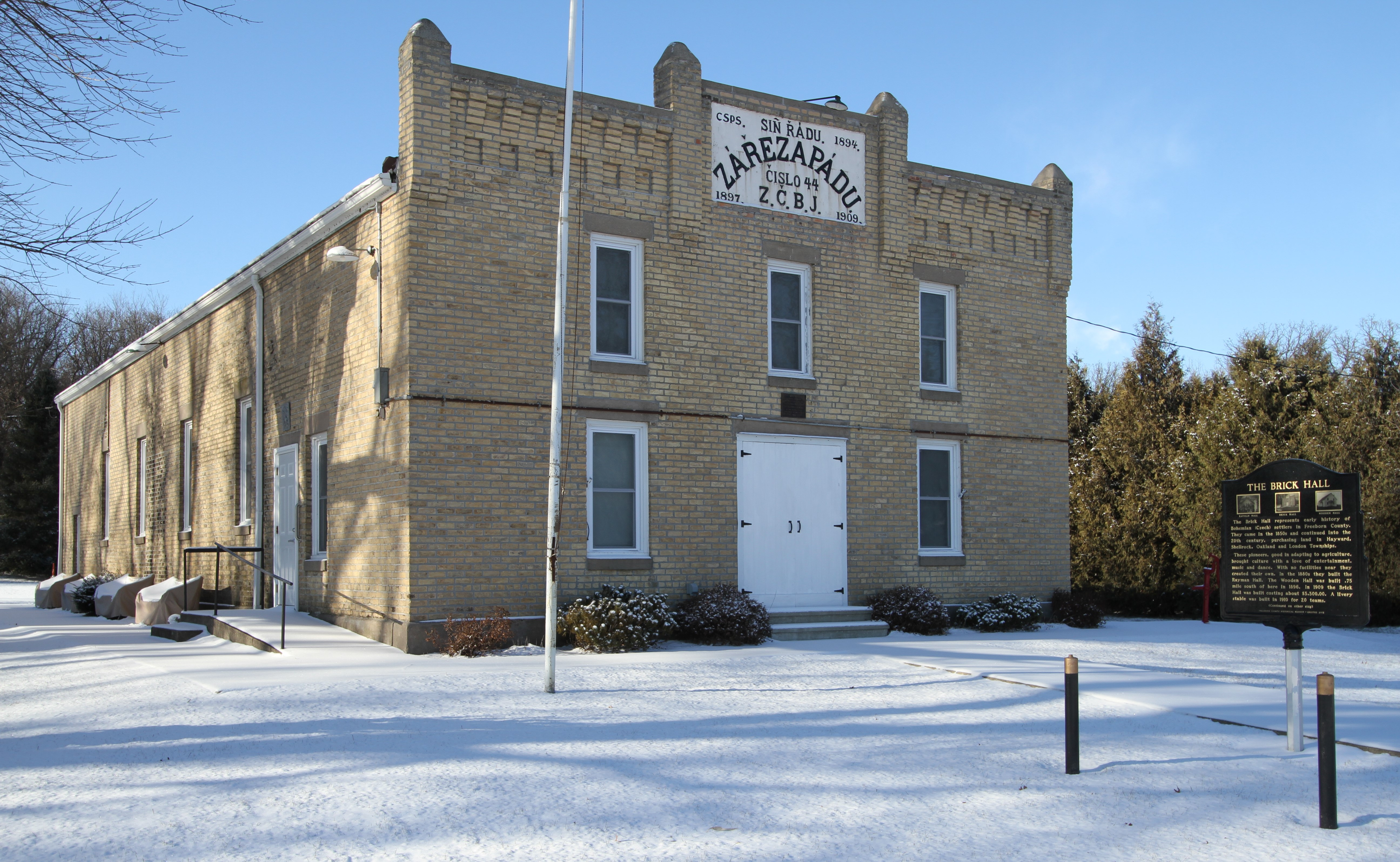
- Lodge Zare Zapadu #44 from the east

- Location within Minnesota
- Nearest city: Hayward, Minnesota
- Coordinates: 43°36′29.7″N 93°10′9″W
- Area: 1.5 acres (0.61 ha)
- Built: 1909
- Architect: J.R. Lukes
- NRHP reference No.: 86000479
- Added to NRHP: March 20, 1986

Lodge Zare Zapadu (Glow of the West) #44, known locally as Yellow Brick Hall and also known as Bohemian Brick Hall and Z.G.B.J. Council Hall #44, is a historic clubhouse of the Zapadni Ceska Bratrska Jednota serving the Czech-American community in rural Freeborn County, Minnesota, United States.

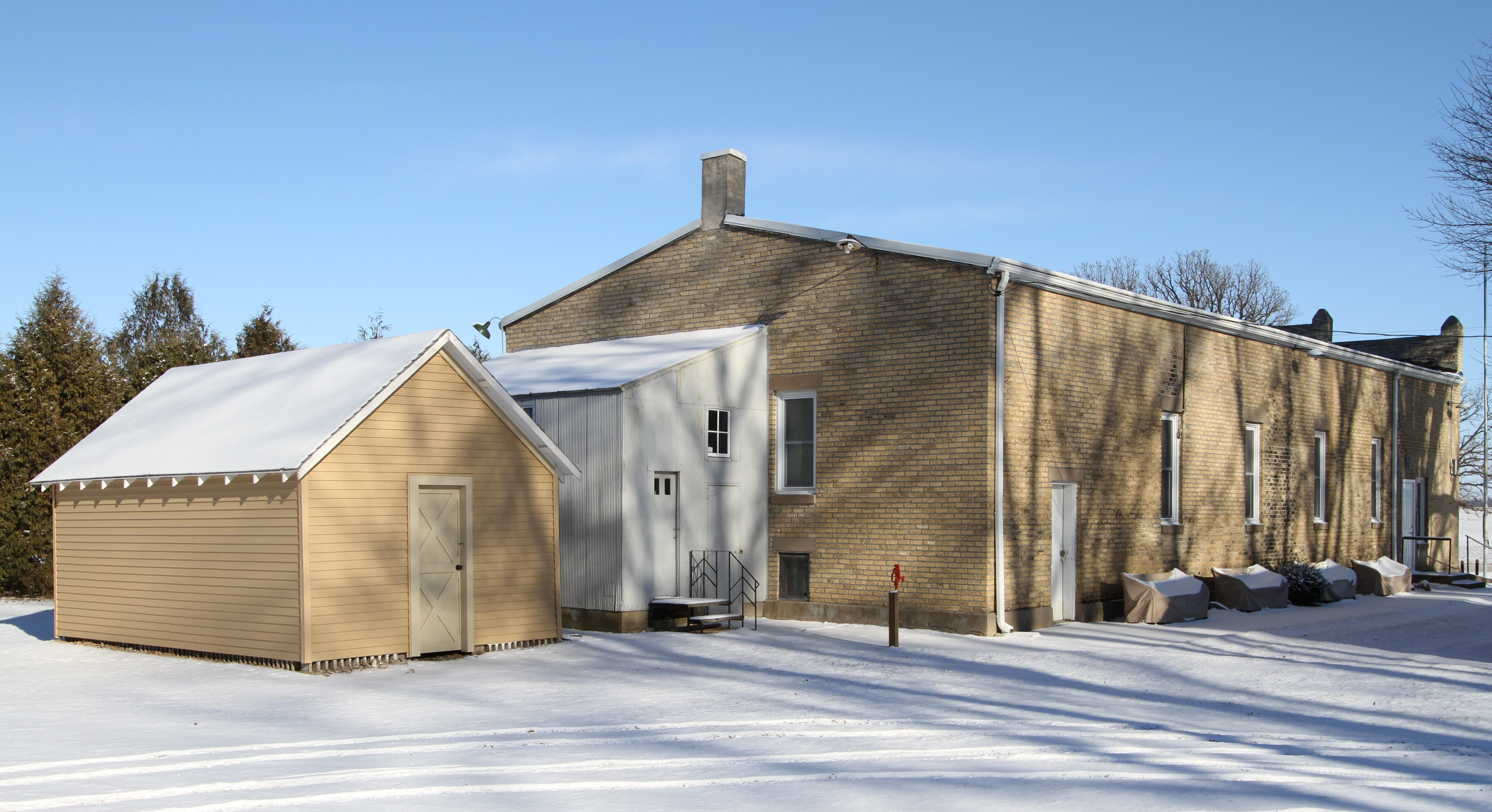
The site from the west

It is located on County Road #30 about 2.5 miles north of Myrtle in the southeastern part of Freeborn County. It was built in 1909 and cost approximately $3,300.

The building was listed on the U.S. National Register of Historic Places in 1986. It was deemed significant as the last surviving one of three fraternal lodge buildings serving immigrants from Bohemia that was located in southeastern Freeborn County. It was a social and cultural center that had an annual festival and parade, and it provided insurance to its members.

In 1985, the stage area of the hall still included a historic mural painted by a Mr. Avery early in the 1900s depicting Karlstejn Castle in Bohemia.
