= ZCBJ Hall (Tyndall, South Dakota) =

- U.S. National Register of Historic Places
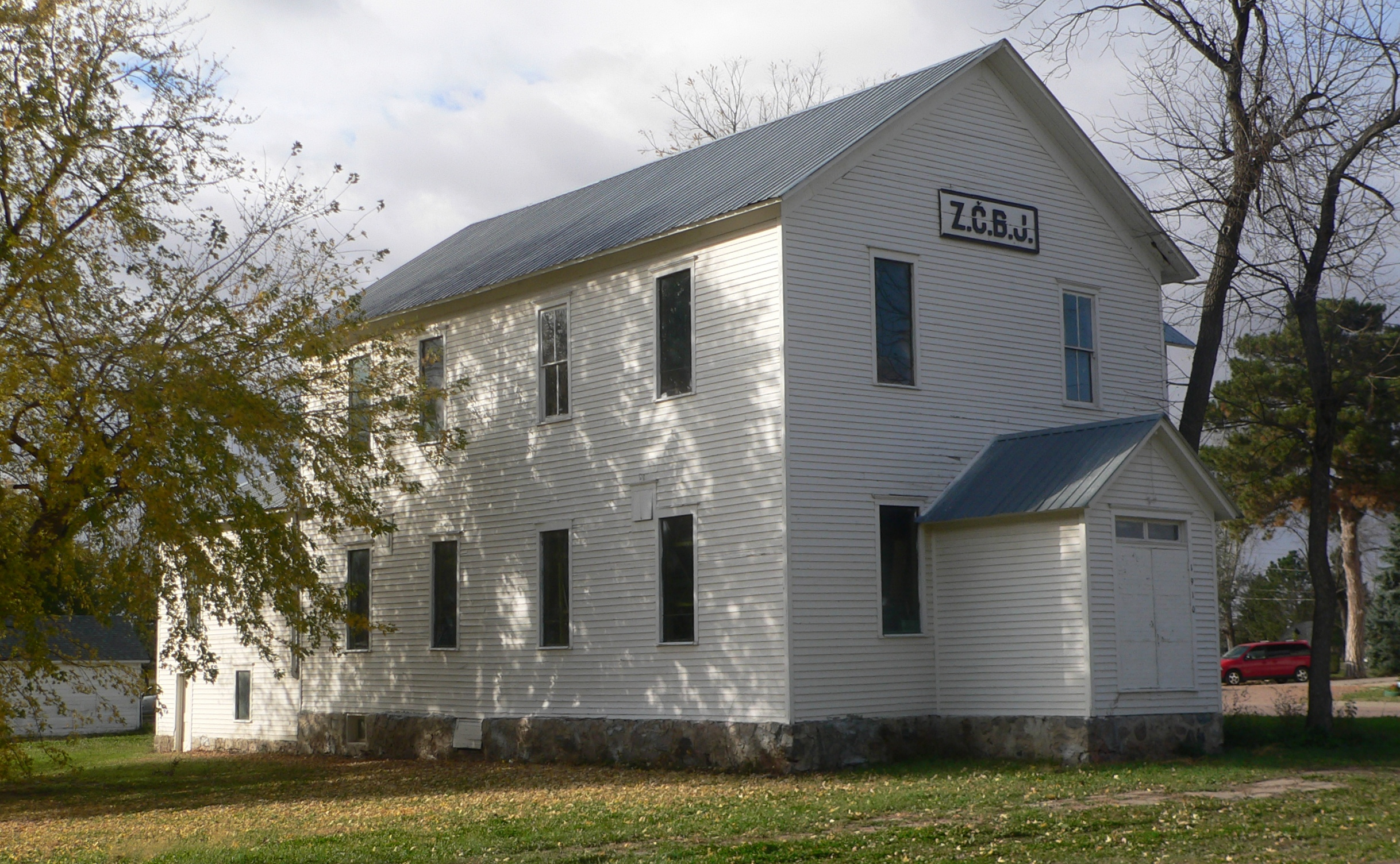

- Location within South Dakota Location within the United States
- Location: 1910 Ivy Street, Tyndall, South Dakota
- Coordinates: 42.995572°N 97.865756°W
- NRHP reference No.: 85000181
- Added to NRHP: January 31, 1985

The ZCBJ Hall is a building in Tyndall, South Dakota, United States that historically served as a meeting hall for the Czech community. The building, formerly a high school, was purchased by Zapadni Ceska Bratrska Jednota from the Tyndall Independent School Dist. No.3 in 1908. It was listed on the National Register of Historic Places on January 31, 1985.

== See also ==
- Czech-Slovak Protective Society
