= C.S.P.S. Hall (Saint Paul, Minnesota) =

- U.S. National Register of Historic Places
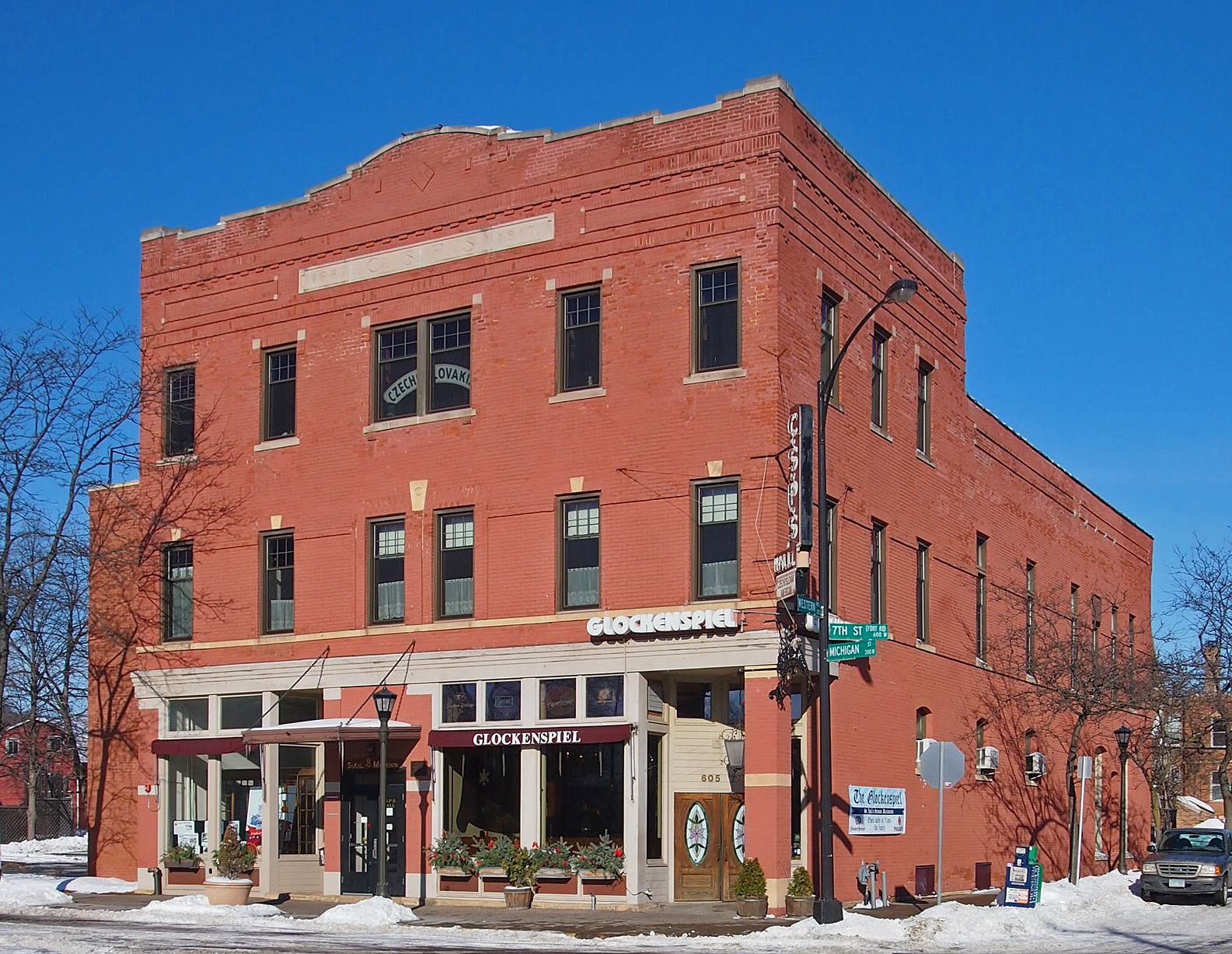
- C.S.P.S. Hall from the southeast

- Location within Minnesota Location within the United States
- Location: 381-383 Michigan Street; Saint Paul, Minnesota
- Coordinates: 44°56′7″N 93°6′58″W
- Built: 1887, 1917 remodeling
- Architect: Raymond P. Pavlecka (1917 remodeling)
- NRHP reference No.: 77000763
- Added to NRHP: February 17, 1977

The C.S.P.S. Hall, also known as Czech Hall or as CSPS Sokol Hall, is the home of the Czech-Slovak Protective Society Hall — a recreation center and meeting house used for social events, including Sokol events; important to the cultural preservation of Czech and Slovak immigrants in Saint Paul, Minnesota. It is listed on the National Register of Historic Places.

The C.S.P.S. was founded in St. Louis, Missouri, in 1854, and, like other immigrant societies, began by offering a kind of insurance program, which provided for members when they were ill and covered funeral expenses.
