= Bohemian National Hall =

Cultural center in Manhattan, New York

Coordinates: 40°46′09″N 73°57′23″W

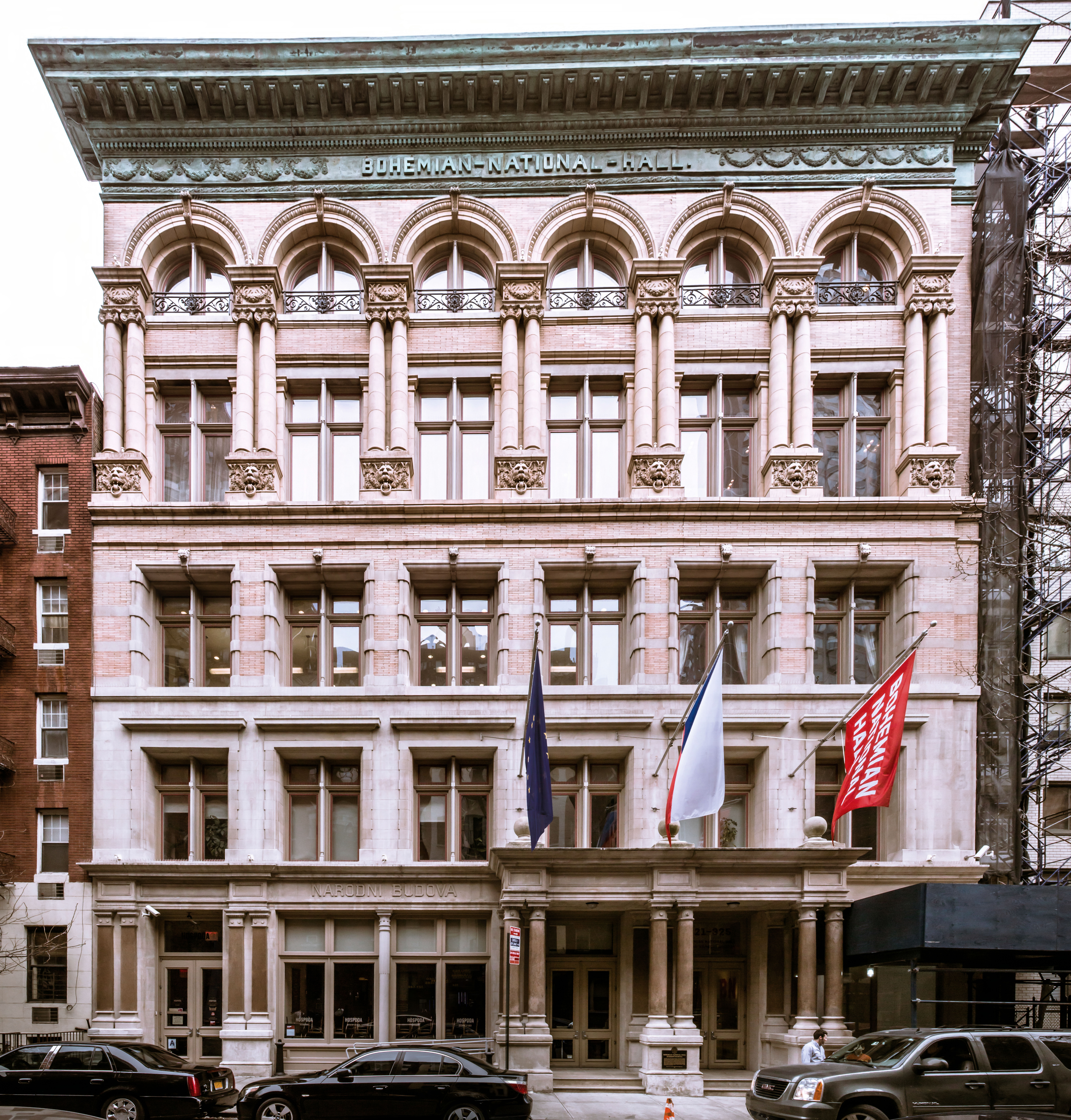
Bohemian National Hall (between 1st and 2nd Avenue), 321 E 73rd Street, New York, NY 10021

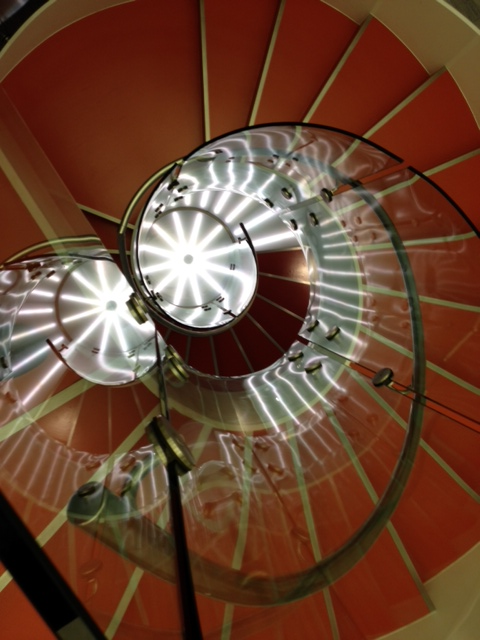
Interior

The Bohemian National Hall (Czech: Česká národní budova) is a five-story edifice at 321 East 73rd Street on the Upper East Side of Manhattan in New York City. Constructed between 1895 and 1897 in neo-Renaissance style by architect William C. Frohne. It was a Czech American social and culture center in New York City.

Through the decades, the hall's role shifted; from the late 1930s to the 1980s, it accommodated diverse organizations, including the birthplace of the Manhattan Theater Club. In recognition of its historical and architectural significance, the New York City Landmarks Preservation Commission bestowed landmark status upon it in 1994.

In 2001, it was sold by the Bohemian Benevolent & Literary Association to the Czech government for $1. In return, the Czech government agreed to renovate the building. Its first use after the change of ownership came in 2005, when it served as the venue for a celebration of the 70th birthday of Václav Havel, a kickoff event for Untitled Theater Company #61's Havel Festival. After a few more events, the Hall shut down for further renovation, reopening October 30, 2008.

Today, the Bohemian National Hall fulfills a multifaceted role. Housing the Czech Consulate, the New York Czech Center, the Bohemian Benevolent & Literary Association and the Dvorak American Heritage Association. The premises encompass diverse amenities including a modest cinema, an art gallery, a major ballroom/theater and a roof terrace. A significant addition arrived on May 23, 2011, with the establishment of a Czech restaurant named Hospoda on the ground floor of the edifice.

In January 2024 the Bohemian National Hall generated controversy by hosting an event for Moms for Liberty through the Bohemian Benevolent & Literary Association.

== See also ==
- National Register of Historic Places listings in Manhattan below 14th Street
- List of New York City Designated Landmarks in Manhattan below 14th Street
