= Haugen, Wisconsin =

- Village
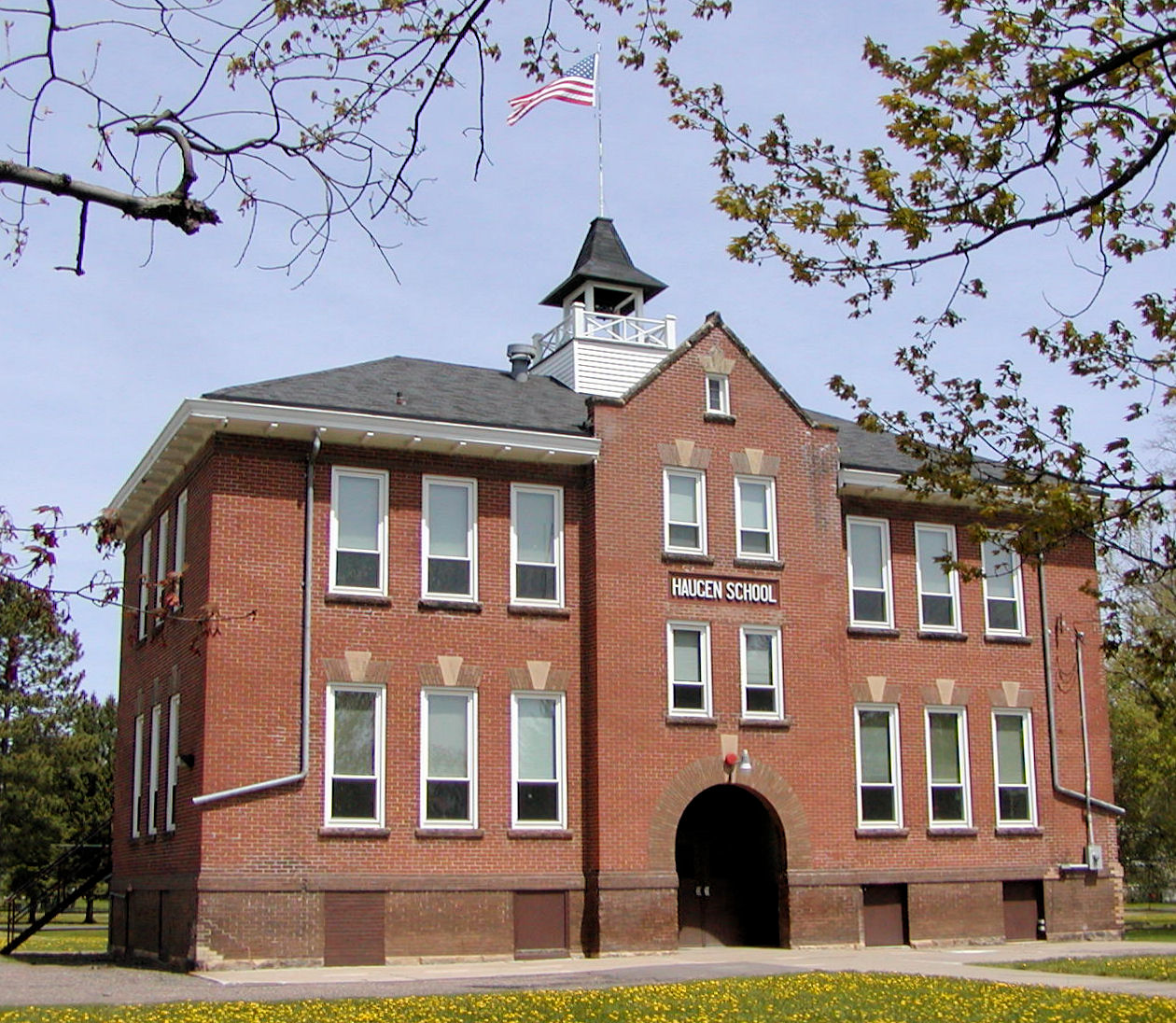
- Haugen School

- Location of Haugen in Barron County, Wisconsin
- Coordinates: 45°36′31″N 91°46′39″W
- Country: United States
- State: Wisconsin
- County: Barron

Area
  - Total: 0.51 sq mi (1.32 km^{2})
  - Land: 0.51 sq mi (1.31 km^{2})
  - Water: 0.0077 sq mi (0.02 km^{2})
- Elevation: 1,230 ft (375 m)

Population (2020)
  - Total: 266
  - Density: 526/sq mi (203/km^{2})
- Time zone: UTC-6 (Central (CST))
  - Summer (DST): UTC-5 (CDT)
- Area codes: 715 & 534
- FIPS code: 55-33225
- GNIS feature ID: 1566142
- Website: http://www.villageofhaugen.com/

Haugen (/ˈhɑːɡən/ HAH-gən) is a village in Barron County in the U.S. state of Wisconsin. The population was 266 at the 2020 census.

== History ==
Haugen was named in 1886 after the Norwegian settler Nils P. Haugen, a local landowner, lawyer and congressman who emigrated from Buskerud, Norway in 1854, A post office called Haugen has been in operation since 1889.

The ZCBJ Hall in Haugen, a historical meeting place for Czech-Americans, is listed on the National Register of Historic Places.

== Geography ==
Haugen is located at 45°36′31″N 91°46′39″W (45.608497, -91.777379).

According to the United States Census Bureau, the village has a total area of 0.52 square miles (1.35 km^{2}), of which 0.51 square miles (1.32 km^{2}) is land and 0.01 square miles (0.03 km^{2}) is water.

Haugen is located along U.S. Highway 53, as well as County Roads SS and V.

== Demographics ==
Historical population
Census	Pop.	Note	%±
1920	426		—
1930	249		−41.5%
1940	268		7.6%
1950	246		−8.2%
1960	265		7.7%
1970	246		−7.2%
1980	251		2.0%
1990	305		21.5%
2000	287		−5.9%
2010	287		0.0%
2020	266		−7.3%
U.S. Decennial Census

=== 2010 census ===
As of the census of 2010, there were 287 people, 128 households, and 72 families living in the village. The population density was 562.7 inhabitants per square mile (217.3/km^{2}). There were 143 housing units at an average density of 280.4 per square mile (108.3/km^{2}). The racial makeup of the village was 94.1% White, 0.7% Asian, 1.4% from other races, and 3.8% from two or more races. Hispanic or Latino people of any race were 1.7% of the population.

There were 128 households, of which 32.0% had children under the age of 18 living with them, 46.1% were married couples living together, 7.0% had a female householder with no husband present, 3.1% had a male householder with no wife present, and 43.8% were non-families. 32.8% of all households were made up of individuals, and 15.6% had someone living alone who was 65 years of age or older. The average household size was 2.24 and the average family size was 2.93.

The median age in the village was 38.6 years. 23.7% of residents were under the age of 18; 5.6% were between the ages of 18 and 24; 33.1% were from 25 to 44; 23.1% were from 45 to 64; and 14.6% were 65 years of age or older. The gender makeup of the village was 52.3% male and 47.7% female.

=== 2000 census ===
As of the census of 2000, there were 287 people, 120 households, and 75 families living in the village. The population density was 562.5 people per square mile (217.3/km^{2}). There were 131 housing units at an average density of 256.8 per square mile (99.2/km^{2}). The racial makeup of the village was 100.00% White. Hispanic or Latino people of any race were 0.70% of the population.

There were 120 households, out of which 29.2% had children under the age of 18 living with them, 50.0% were married couples living together, 7.5% had a female householder with no husband present, and 37.5% were non-families. 31.7% of all households were made up of individuals, and 19.2% had someone living alone who was 65 years of age or older. The average household size was 2.39 and the average family size was 3.07.

In the village, the population was spread out, with 26.8% under the age of 18, 4.2% from 18 to 24, 33.4% from 25 to 44, 16.7% from 45 to 64, and 18.8% who were 65 years of age or older. The median age was 38 years. For every 100 females, there were 111.0 males. For every 100 females age 18 and over, there were 112.1 males.

The median income for a household in the village was $30,714, and the median income for a family was $46,250. Males had a median income of $29,375 versus $22,500 for females. The per capita income for the village was $17,258. About 8.3% of families and 10.9% of the population were below the poverty line, including 15.3% of those under the age of eighteen and 14.7% of those 65 or over.
