= ZCBJ Hall (Haugen, Wisconsin) =

- U.S. National Register of Historic Places
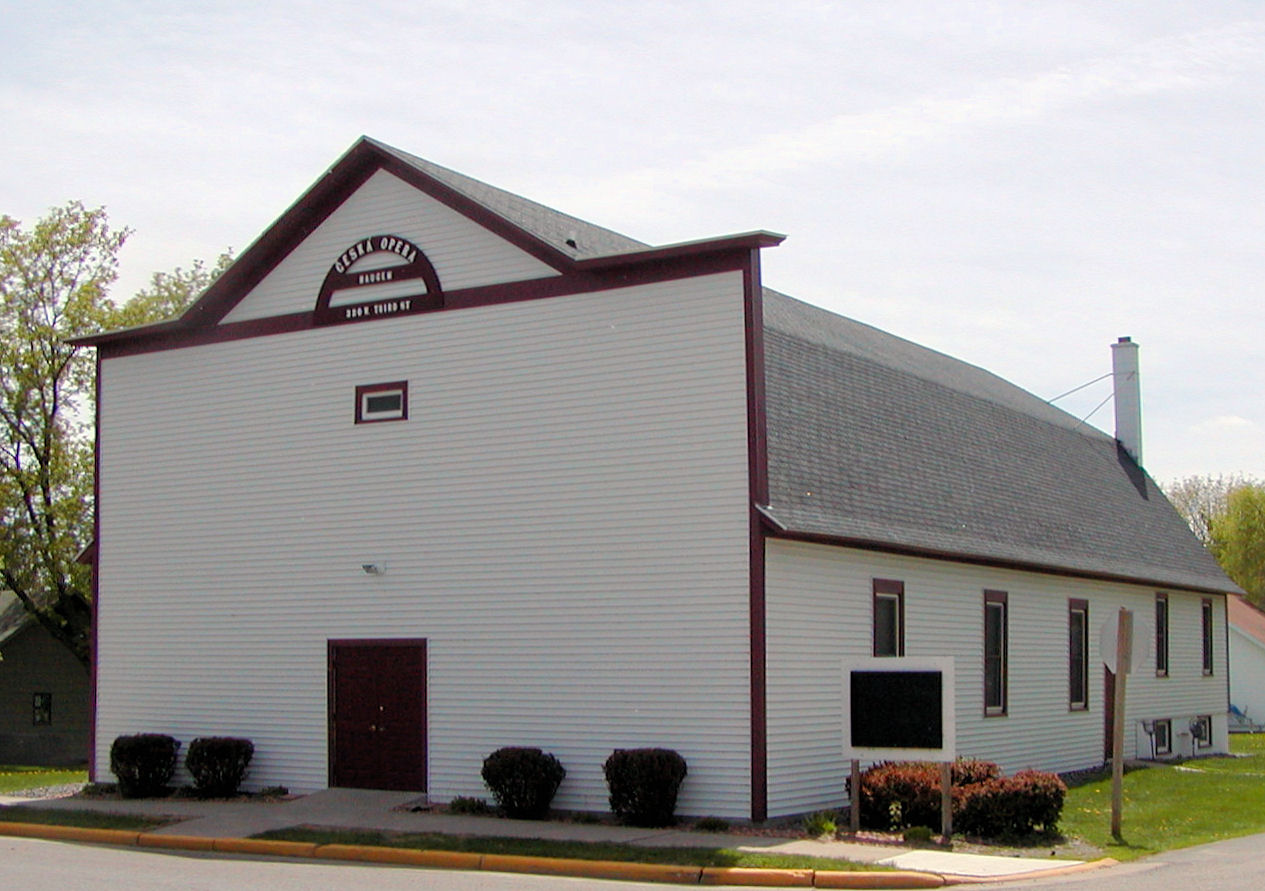

- Location within Wisconsin Location within the United States
- Location: 320 W. 3rd St., Haugen, Wisconsin
- Coordinates: 45°36′28″N 91°46′44″W
- Area: less than one acre
- Built: 1910
- NRHP reference No.: 85000768
- Added to NRHP: April 11, 1985

The ZCBJ Hall, also known as Community Hall, is a building in Haugen, Wisconsin, United States, that was built in 1910. It was listed on the National Register of Historic Places in 1985. It historically served as a meeting hall for the Czech community.

It is a 50 by 75 feet (15 m × 23 m) single-story frame building with a stage and with a partial basement. It was built in three stages, the first believed to have been by the local members of the Zapadni Cesko Bratrska Jednota (ZCBJ), or Western Czech Fraternal Union, around 1913. It was doubled in size the next year. A 1915 expansion added the last third of the building, including the stage and a basement, and added a new roof joining all three sections. The first 50 feet (15 m) has just a wooden foundation; the last section has a concrete foundation.

== See also ==
- Czech-Slovak Protective Society
