= Morse Bluff, Nebraska =

Village in Saunders County, Nebraska, United States

- Village
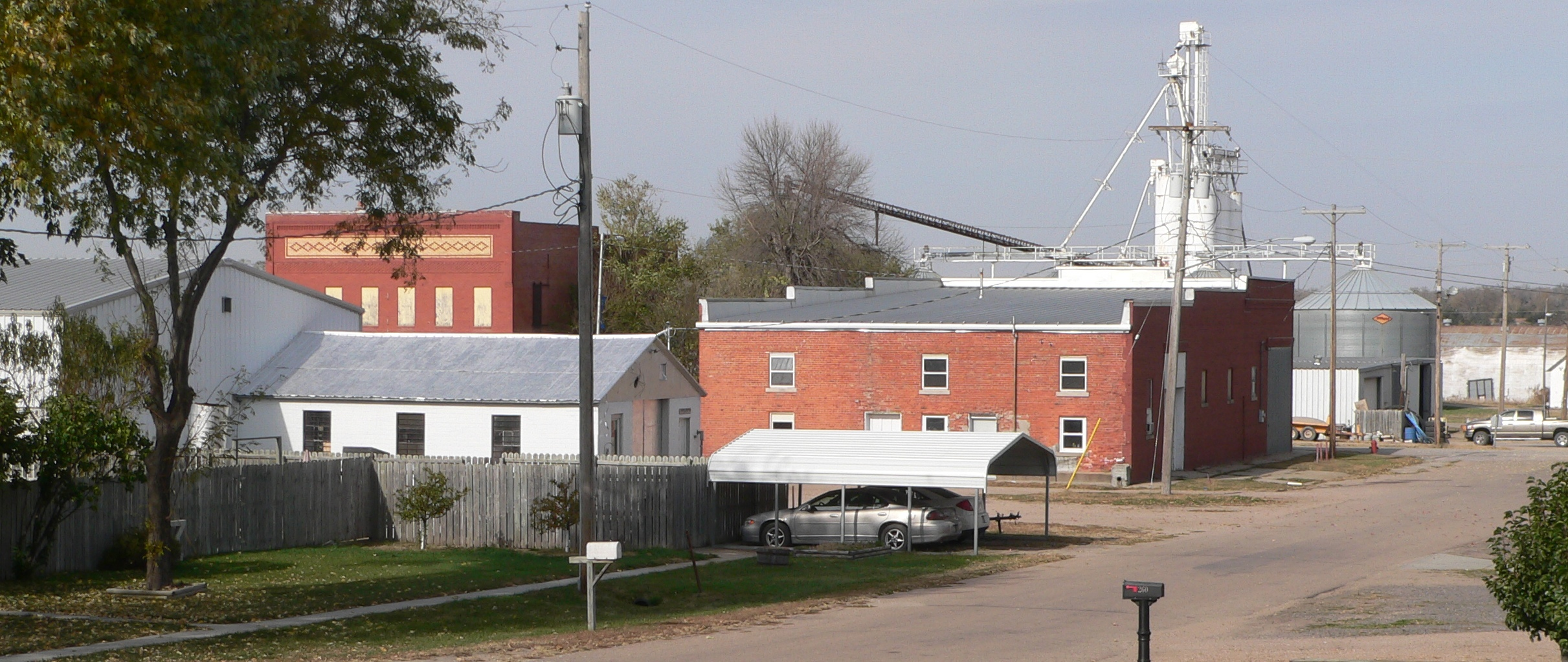
- Looking south at downtown Morse Bluff, October 2011

- Location of Morse Bluff, Nebraska
- Coordinates: 41°25′51″N 96°45′59″W
- Country: United States
- State: Nebraska
- County: Saunders

Area
  - Total: 0.18 sq mi (0.46 km^{2})
  - Land: 0.18 sq mi (0.46 km^{2})
  - Water: 0 sq mi (0.00 km^{2})
- Elevation: 1,289 ft (393 m)

Population (2020)
  - Total: 117
  - Density: 660/sq mi (254.8/km^{2})
- Time zone: UTC-6 (Central (CST))
  - Summer (DST): UTC-5 (CDT)
- ZIP code: 68648
- Area code: 402
- FIPS code: 31-32865
- GNIS feature ID: 2399401

Morse Bluff is a village in Saunders County, Nebraska, United States. The population was 117 at the 2020 census.

== History ==
Morse Bluff was platted in 1887 when the Chicago & North Western Railroad was extended to that point. It was named for Chester Morse, the original owner of the town site.

== Geography ==
According to the United States Census Bureau, the village has a total area of 0.18 square miles (0.47 km^{2}), all land.

== Demographics ==
Historical population
Census	Pop.	Note	%±
1900	177		—
1910	196		10.7%
1920	215		9.7%
1930	179		−16.7%
1940	170		−5.0%
1950	142		−16.5%
1960	119		−16.2%
1970	162		36.1%
1980	132		−18.5%
1990	128		−3.0%
2000	134		4.7%
2010	135		0.7%
2020	117		−13.3%
U.S. Decennial Census

=== 2010 census ===
As of the census of 2010, there were 135 people, 58 households, and 39 families living in the village. The population density was 750.0 inhabitants per square mile (289.6/km^{2}). There were 60 housing units at an average density of 333.3 per square mile (128.7/km^{2}). The racial makeup of the village was 99.3% White and 0.7% Asian. Hispanic or Latino of any race were 2.2% of the population.

There were 58 households, of which 31.0% had children under the age of 18 living with them, 51.7% were married couples living together, 8.6% had a female householder with no husband present, 6.9% had a male householder with no wife present, and 32.8% were non-families. 31.0% of all households were made up of individuals, and 10.3% had someone living alone who was 65 years of age or older. The average household size was 2.33 and the average family size was 2.92.

The median age in the village was 39.3 years. 25.9% of residents were under the age of 18; 11.1% were between the ages of 18 and 24; 18.4% were from 25 to 44; 30.3% were from 45 to 64; and 14.1% were 65 years of age or older. The gender makeup of the village was 47.4% male and 52.6% female.

=== 2000 census ===
As of the census of 2000, there were 134 people, 58 households, and 40 families living in the village. The population density was 746.4 inhabitants per square mile (288.2/km^{2}). There were 59 housing units at an average density of 328.6 per square mile (126.9/km^{2}). The racial makeup of the village was 100.00% White. Hispanic or Latino of any race were 1.49% of the population.

There were 58 households, out of which 41.4% had children under the age of 18 living with them, 55.2% were married couples living together, 8.6% had a female householder with no husband present, and 31.0% were non-families. 31.0% of all households were made up of individuals, and 13.8% had someone living alone who was 65 years of age or older. The average household size was 2.31 and the average family size was 2.88.

In the village, the population was spread out, with 28.4% under the age of 18, 6.7% from 18 to 24, 26.9% from 25 to 44, 17.2% from 45 to 64, and 20.9% who were 65 years of age or older. The median age was 37 years. For every 100 females, there were 100.0 males. For every 100 females age 18 and over, there were 100.0 males.

As of 2000 the median income for a household in the village was $30,625, and the median income for a family was $41,875. Males had a median income of $25,625 versus $16,750 for females. The per capita income for the village was $14,051. There were no families and 3.0% of the population living below the poverty line, including no under eighteens and 6.9% of those over 64.

== See also ==
- List of municipalities in Nebraska
