= Verdigre, Nebraska =

- Village
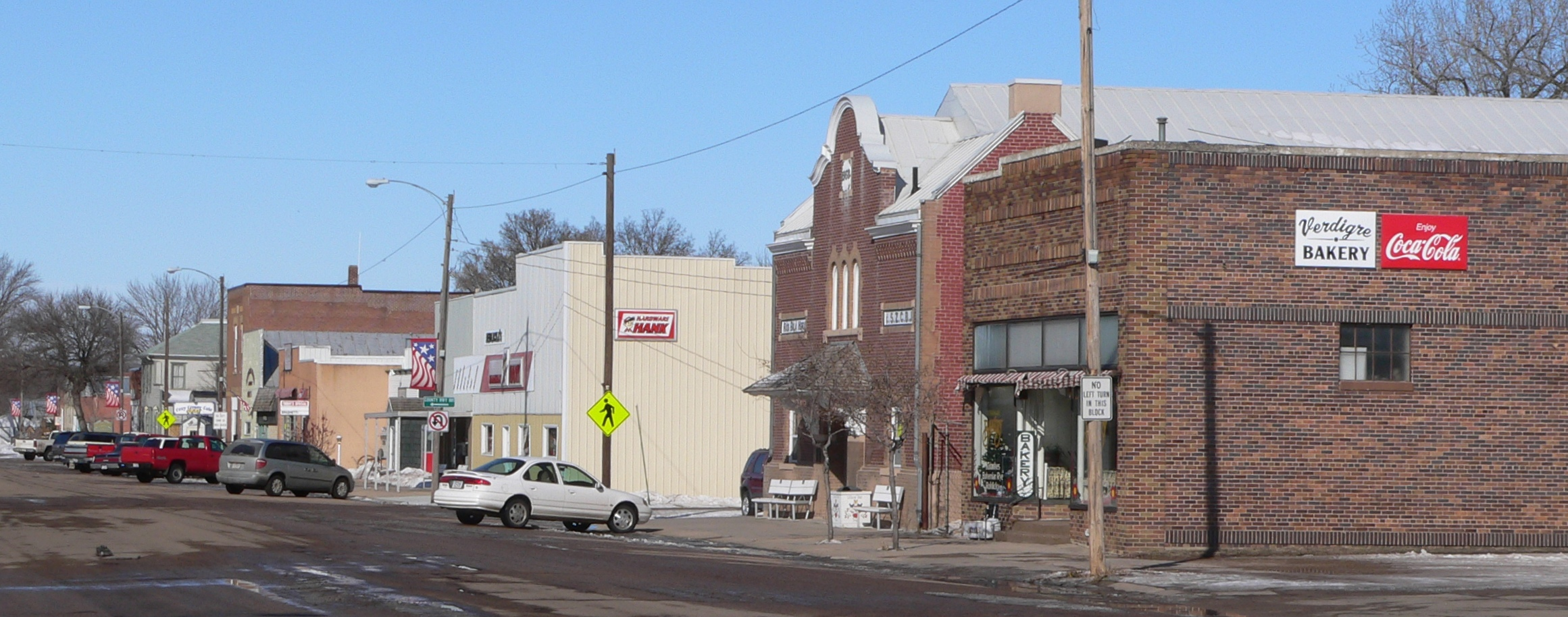
- Downtown Verdigre: east side of Main Street looking north from 5th Avenue

- Location of Verdigre, Nebraska
- Coordinates: 42°35′50″N 98°02′08″W
- Country: United States
- State: Nebraska
- County: Knox

Area
  - Total: 0.56 sq mi (1.46 km^{2})
  - Land: 0.55 sq mi (1.42 km^{2})
  - Water: 0.015 sq mi (0.04 km^{2})
- Elevation: 1,371 ft (418 m)

Population (2020)
  - Total: 554
  - Density: 1,011.8/sq mi (390.65/km^{2})
- Time zone: UTC-6 (Central (CST))
  - Summer (DST): UTC-5 (CDT)
- ZIP code: 68783
- Area code: 402
- FIPS code: 31-50370
- GNIS feature ID: 2400055
- Website: www.verdigre.org

Verdigre is a village in Knox County, Nebraska, United States. As of the 2020 census, Verdigre had a population of 554.

== History ==
Verdigre was platted in 1887 shortly before the Fremont, Elkhorn and Missouri Valley Railroad was extended to that point. It took its name from nearby Verdigre Creek.

Verdigre was the site of a fatal injury during a professional wrestling tag team match on June 13, 1971, when Alberto Torres was hurt while competing against Ox Baker. Torres died of a ruptured appendix four days after being hurt.

== Geography ==
According to the United States Census Bureau, the village has a total area of 0.57 square miles (1.48 km^{2}), of which 0.55 square miles (1.42 km^{2}) is land and 0.02 square miles (0.05 km^{2}) is water.

== Demographics ==
Historical population
Census	Pop.	Note	%±
1890	207		—
1900	200		−3.4%
1910	403		101.5%
1920	528		31.0%
1930	618		17.0%
1940	556		−10.0%
1950	570		2.5%
1960	584		2.5%
1970	570		−2.4%
1980	617		8.2%
1990	607		−1.6%
2000	519		−14.5%
2010	575		10.8%
2020	554		−3.7%
U.S. Decennial Census

=== 2010 census ===
As of the census of 2010, there were 575 people, 246 households, and 126 families living in the village. The population density was 1,045.5 inhabitants per square mile (403.7/km^{2}). There were 287 housing units at an average density of 521.8 per square mile (201.5/km^{2}). The racial makeup of the village was 96.3% White, 1.9% Native American, and 1.7% from two or more races. Hispanic or Latino of any race were 0.2% of the population.

There was 246 households, of which 18.3% had children under the age of 18 living with them, 41.9% are married couples living together, 6.1% had a female householder with no husband present, 3.3% had a male householder with no wife present, and 48.8% were non-families. 48.0% of all households were made up of individuals, and 29.6% had someone living alone who was 65 years of age or older. The average household size was 1.94 and the average family size was 2.74.

The median age in the village was 56.7 years. 15.3% of residents were under the age of 18; 3.8% were between the ages of 18 and 24; 14% were from 25 to 44; 26.3% were from 45 to 64; and 40.7% were 65 years of age or older. The gender makeup of the village was 46.1% male and 53.9% female.

=== 2000 census ===
As of the census of 2000, there were 519 people, 232 households, and 122 families living in the village. The population density was 934.1 inhabitants per square mile (360.7/km^{2}). There were 286 housing units at an average density of 514.7 per square mile (198.7/km^{2}). The racial makeup of the village was 97.88% White, 1.93% Native American, and 0.19% from two or more races.

There were 232 households, out of which 19.0% had children under the age of 18 living with them, 47.4% were married couples living together, 4.7% had a female householder with no husband present, and 47.4% were non-families. 45.7% of all households were made up of individuals, and 34.1% had someone living alone who was 65 years of age or older. The average household size was 1.92 and the average family size was 2.71.

In the village, the population was spread out, with 15.2% under the age of 18, 3.9% from 18 to 24, 16.2% from 25 to 44, 19.3% from 45 to 64, and 45.5% who were 65 years of age or older. The median age was 59 years. For every 100 females, there were 83.4 males. For every 100 females age 18 and over, there were 76.0 males.

As of 2000 the median income for a household in the village was $21,667, and the median income for a family was $30,208. Males had a median income of $22,031 versus $12,708 for females. The per capita income for the village was $18,128. About 4.7% of families and 10.0% of the population were below the poverty line, including 2.9% of those under age 18 and 19.0% of those age 65 or over.

== Kolach Days ==
Verdigre touts itself as "The Kolach Capital of the world". A kolach is a pastry of Czech and Slovak origin, with a fruit center, usually poppy seed, prunes, cherries, or blueberries, somewhat similar to a Danish. During the summer, usually the second week of June, Verdigre hosts a huge festival celebrating the kolach and usually provides rides, tractor pulls, both duck and turtle races, live music, mud volleyball, kolach eating contests, and a variety of activities for the community. Verdigre crowns its annual Kolach Queen & King during this festival. Kolaches are sold by the local bakery and churches, and a variety of local wares and produce are available at outdoor stalls on Main street. Children run for Kolach Royalty ( both King and Queen ) by selling the most raffle tickets during the festivities.

== Notable people ==
- Pauline Davis - California state legislator
- William R. Schmidt (1889–1966) - major general in the United States Army during World War II.
