= Czech-Slovak Protective Society =

The Czech-Slovak Protective Society (CSPS), which became the Czecho Slovakian Association, was an organization supporting the welfare of Czech and Slovak immigrants to the United States. The Czech-Slovak Protective Society started as an insurance services organization. It was once the largest Czech-American freethought fraternity in the United States.

== History ==
The CSPS was founded in St. Louis, Missouri, in 1854, and, like other immigrant societies, began by offering a kind of insurance program, which provided for members when they were ill and covered funeral expenses. It was the "largest Bohemian fraternal organization".

The Czecho-Slovak Protective Society, headquartered in St. Louis, Missouri, joined in organizing the Czechoslovak Society of America in 1933. That organization, based in Lombard, Illinois, changed its name to CSA Fraternal Life in 1982.

Č.S.P.S. stands for "Česko-Slovenský Podporující Spolek" (Czech-Slovak Protective Society). These lodges were the forerunner of the (Západní Česko-Bratrská Jednota, or Western Bohemian Fraternal Association). Both associations offered a type of insurance for the Czech people. The association later became known as the Western Fraternal Life Association.

In the C.S.P.S., the initial deposit was twenty-five cents to the dollar, and monthly fees of fifty cents provided financial support to members in the event of illness, including serious childhood illnesses, injury, disability, or death. In 1897, due to contradictions (he did not agree that a 20-year-old should pay the same death fees as a 60-year-old), John Rosicky became one of the founders of the West Czech-Bratrské Jednota (Z.Č.B.J.).

== Local lodges ==
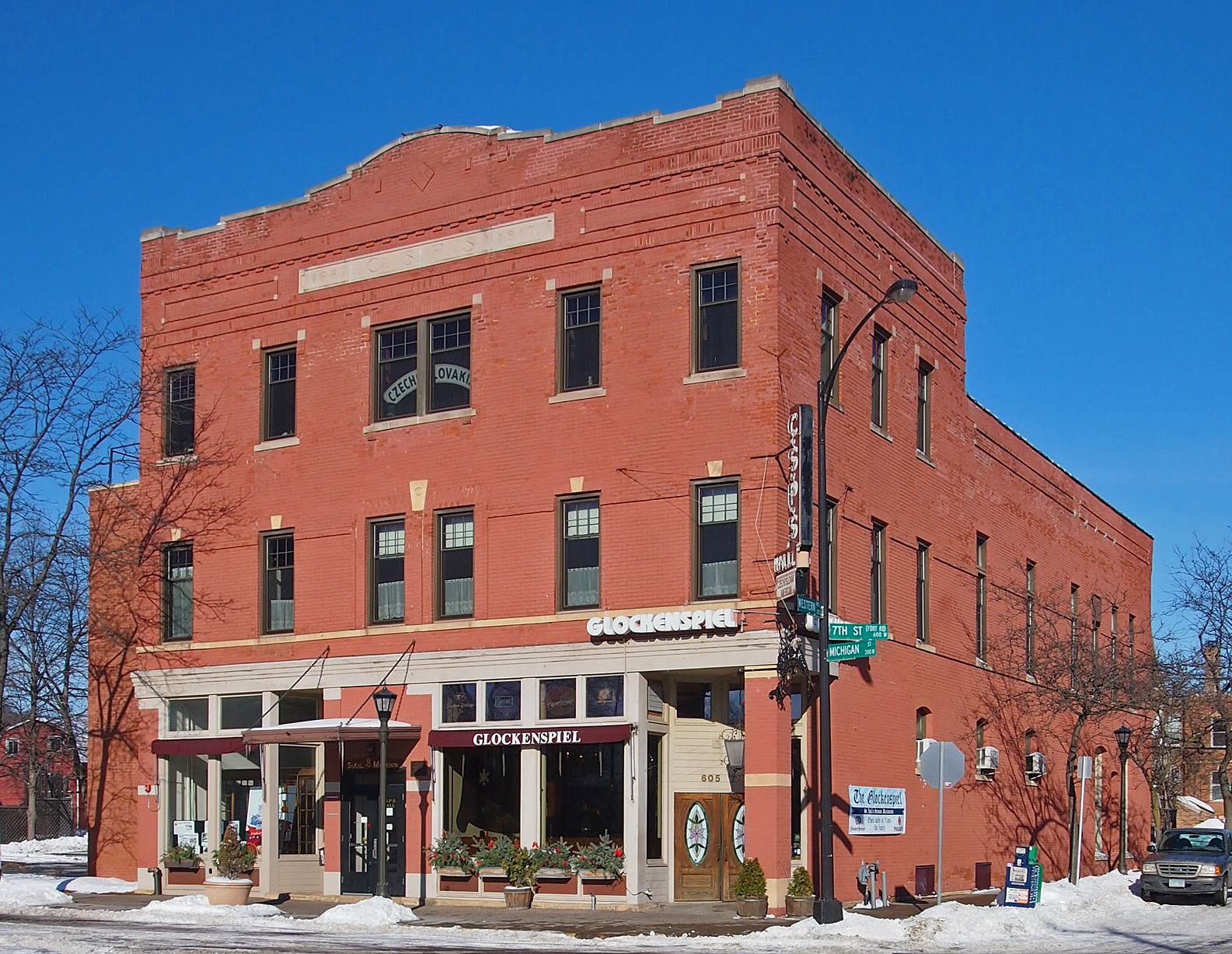
C.S.P.S. Hall (Saint Paul, Minnesota)

- The first CSPS lodge in Cedar Rapids, Iowa, was started in 1879, and two more were started by 1882. The C.S.P.S. Hall (Cedar Rapids, Iowa), was built during 1890-91 and expanded twice in the next two decades. It is NRHP-listed in 1978.
- The Grand Lodge Č.S.P.S. of Baltimore was founded in 1880. The associated Bohemian National Cemetery, in Baltimore, Maryland, was started in 1884, and is listed on the National Register of Historic Places (NRHP).
- The C.S.P.S. of Iowa City, Iowa, was organized in 1882 and built its Czecho Slovakian Association Hall in 1900. The hall was listed on the NRHP in 1975.
- The C.S.P.S. of Saint Paul, Minnesota built its C.S.P.S. hall in 1887; it is also NRHP-listed.
- Narodni Sin, Edwardsville, Illinois, built 1906, NRHP-listed
- Czech Hall, Yukon, Oklahoma, built 1925, NRHP-listed
- CSPS Lodge-Griesser Bakery, built 1890, in Bryan, Texas, NRHP-listed
