= National Register of Historic Places listings in Knox County, Nebraska =

Location of Knox County in Nebraska

Knox County, Nebraska, United States, has 14 properties and districts listed on the National Register of Historic Places, and two former listings.

The locations of National Register properties and districts for which the latitude and longitude coordinates are included below may be seen in a map.

This National Park Service list is complete through NPS recent listings posted October 30, 2026.

== Current listings ==
| | Name on the Register | Image | Date listed | Location | City or town | Description |
|---|---|---|---|---|---|---|
| 1 | Argo Hotel | Argo Hotel | May 5, 1999 (#99000478) | 211 Kansas St. 42°43′54″N 97°29′49″W | Crofton | |
| 2 | The Commercial Hotel | The Commercial Hotel | April 5, 1990 (#90000563) | 117 Main St. 42°36′00″N 98°02′00″W | Verdigre | |
| 3 | Congregational Church and Manse | Congregational Church and Manse | March 16, 1972 (#72000753) | Santee Sioux Reservation; 42°50′19″N 97°50′46″W | Santee | |
| 4 | Episcopal Church | Episcopal Church | March 16, 1972 (#72000754) | On the Missouri River in the Santee Sioux Reservation; 42°50′27″N 97°50′15″W | Santee | |
| 5 | Gross State Aid Bridge | Gross State Aid Bridge | June 29, 1992 (#92000773) | County road 885 Rd over Verdigris Creek, 3.5 miles north and 0.2 miles west of Verdigre; 42°39′16″N 98°02′34″W | Verdigre | |
| 6 | Knox County Courthouse | Knox County Courthouse | July 5, 1990 (#90000972) | Main St. between Brazile and Bridge Sts. 42°36′32″N 97°52′37″W | Center | |
| 7 | Ponca Agency Archeological District | | July 12, 2006 (#06000555) | Address Restricted | Niobrara | |
| 8 | Ponca Fort Site | | April 3, 1973 (#73001066) | Hilltop in Section 29, Township 33 North, Range 7 West; 42°48′29″N 98°09′50″W | Verdel | University of Nebraska excavations in the 1930s showed this site to be Arikara-affiliated and to date from circa 1790 to 1802 |
| 9 | Ponca Tribal Self-Help Community Building Historic District | Ponca Tribal Self-Help Community Building Historic District | March 13, 2003 (#03000106) | 88915 521 Avenue; approximately 3 miles southeast of Niobrara; 42°42′50″N 98°04′30″W | Niobrara | |
| 10 | Rad Sladkovsky | Rad Sladkovsky | June 29, 1982 (#82003193) | At Pishelville, northwest of Verdigre; 42°43′34″N 98°12′41″W | Verdigre | |
| 11 | St. Rose of Lima Catholic Church and School Complex | St. Rose of Lima Catholic Church and School Complex | March 21, 2011 (#11000106) | 1302-1316 W. 5th St. 42°43′45″N 97°30′03″W | Crofton | |
| 12 | Winnetoon Jail | Winnetoon Jail | February 27, 1995 (#95000094) | Junction of 1st St. and Sherman Ave. 42°30′52″N 97°57′43″W | Winnetoon | |
| 13 | Winnetoon Public School | | March 13, 2020 (#100005053) | 308 Jones St. 42°30′54″N 97°57′49″W | Winnetoon | |
| 14 | Z.C.B.J. Opera House | Z.C.B.J. Opera House | July 6, 1988 (#88000946) | 4th Ave. and Main; 42°35′48″N 98°02′00″W | Verdigre | |

== Former listings ==
| | Name on the Register | Image | Date listed | Date removed | Location | City or town | Description |
|---|---|---|---|---|---|---|---|
| 1 | Niobrara River Bridge | Niobrara River Bridge | November 12, 1992 (#92001576) | December 18, 2025 | Over the Niobrara River 1.3 miles northwest of Niobrara; 42°46′00″N 98°02′55″W | Niobrara | |
| 2 | Pospeshil Theatre | Pospeshil Theatre | September 28, 1988 (#88000935) | March 25, 2019 | 123 Broadway; 42°35′53″N 97°38′44″W | Bloomfield | Burned down; Bloomfield library was built in 2000 on former site |

== See also ==
- List of National Historic Landmarks in Nebraska
- National Register of Historic Places listings in Nebraska
