= Chief Standing Bear Memorial Bridge =

Bridge at the Nebraska–South Dakota border, US

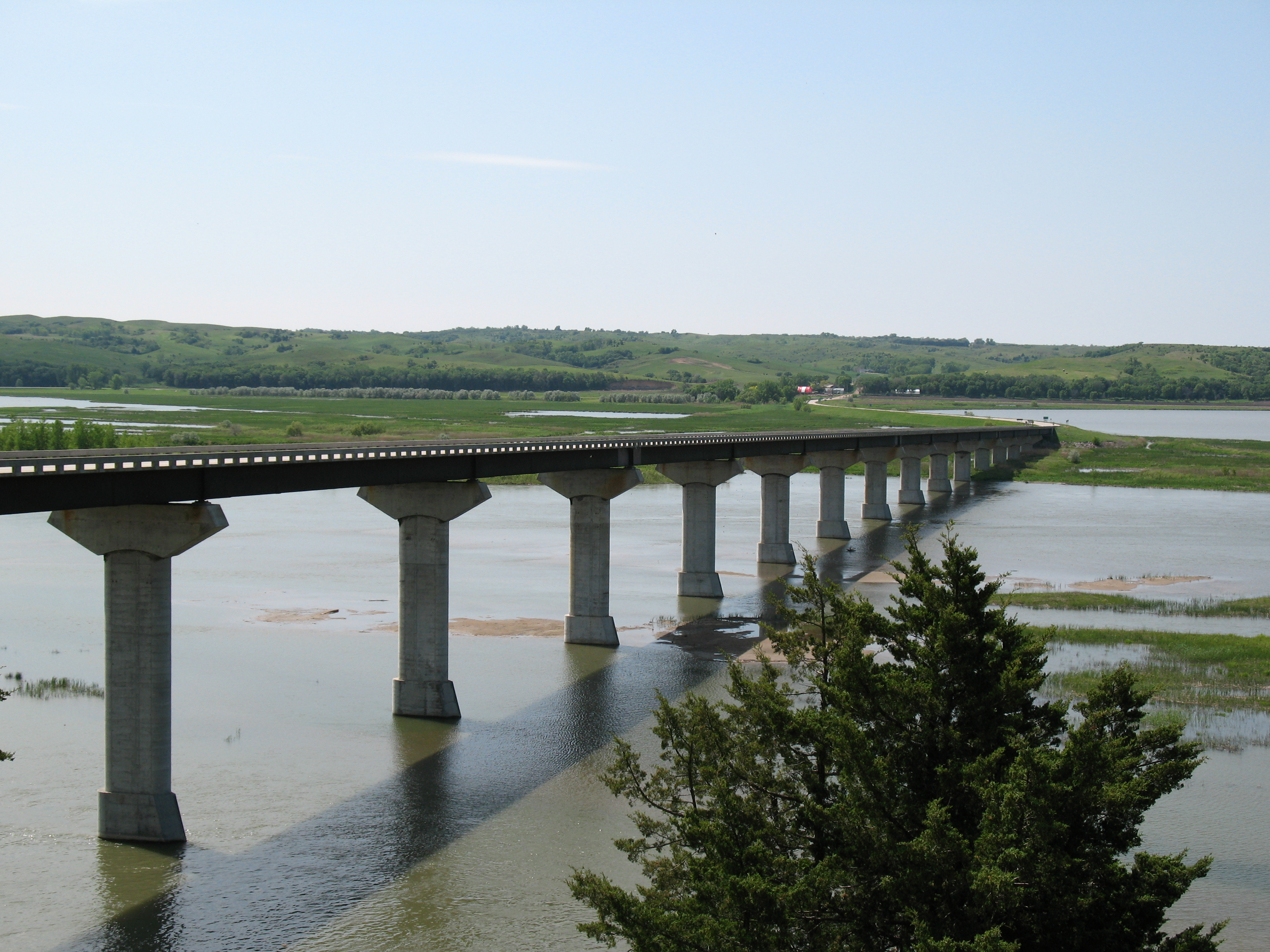
- The bridges as seen from the scenic overlook on the South Dakota side
- Coordinates: 42°46′12″N 97°59′22″W
- Carries: N-14 and SD 37
- Crosses: Missouri River
- Locale: Knox County, Nebraska and Bon Homme County, South Dakota near Niobrara, Nebraska

Characteristics
- Design: Stringer/Multi-beam or girder
- Material: Steel
- Total length: 2,953.2 feet (900.1 m)
- Width: 37.7 feet (11.5 m)
- No. of spans: 16

History
- Construction start: April 20, 1996
- Inaugurated: August 29, 1998

Statistics
- Daily traffic: 555 (as of 2008)

The Chief Standing Bear Memorial Bridge is a bridge across the Missouri River at the Nebraska–South Dakota border. Located near Niobrara, Nebraska, not far downstream from the confluence of the Niobrara River with the Missouri, it joins Nebraska Highway 14 to South Dakota Highway 37.

The bridge is named for Standing Bear, a Ponca chief born and buried nearby, who was the plaintiff in Standing Bear v. Crook, a landmark 1879 U.S. District Court case that established the legal rights of Native Americans to move about freely.

== History ==
Before the bridge was constructed, Highway 14 ended at the Missouri. Travellers who needed to cross the river had to detour 45 miles (72 km) downstream to the Meridian Bridge at Yankton, South Dakota, or 60 miles (97 km) upstream to Fort Randall Dam near Pickstown, South Dakota. A seasonal ferry, closed in the winter, crossed the river at Niobrara for some time; but it ceased operation in 1984.

Local residents had sought a bridge since the 1920s. Construction of a toll bridge began in 1931; but it was ended by the Great Depression. In 1939, President Franklin D. Roosevelt vetoed a bill passed by the U.S. Congress that would have allowed construction to proceed; in 1940, he signed a revised bill to permit construction, but the shortage of materials caused by World War II thwarted it. A third effort was stymied by the Korean War; a fourth attempt failed in the early 1980s.

With the support of U.S. Representative Doug Bereuter of Nebraska, funds continued to be appropriated intermittently for the bridge. In 1995, the U.S. Congress passed a transportation appropriations bill that gave Nebraska and South Dakota enough money to complete the bridge. The project was attacked by television journalist Tom Brokaw, in a series titled "The Fleecing of America", as an unnecessary expenditure of federal money. However, funding survived and construction proceeded. Of the bridge's $17 million cost, about $14 million came from the federal government; the remaining $3 million was supplied by the two states.

The groundbreaking ceremony for the bridge was held on April 20, 1996; dedication ceremonies were held on August 29, 1998.

During the 2011 Missouri River floods the bridge became a dead end on the Nebraska side when that approach was flooded. Many Nebraska residents who worked at the Mike Durfee State Prison on the South Dakota side took to using makeshift motor boats, kayaks, chest waders and a homemade “swamp bikes” to commute between the bridge and their cars out of the flood area—a process which took 30 minutes or more.

== Tourism ==
The bridge is a part of the Missouri River Trail, within the Missouri National Recreational River along with the Vermillion–Newcastle Bridge south of Vermillion, South Dakota, and the Meridian Highway Bridge at Yankton.

The "Bridging the Shores" celebration of the bridge is held annually in Niobrara.

== See also ==
- Missouri National Recreational River
- List of crossings of the Missouri River
