= Missouri National Recreational River =

River in the United States

- IUCN category V (protected landscape/seascape)
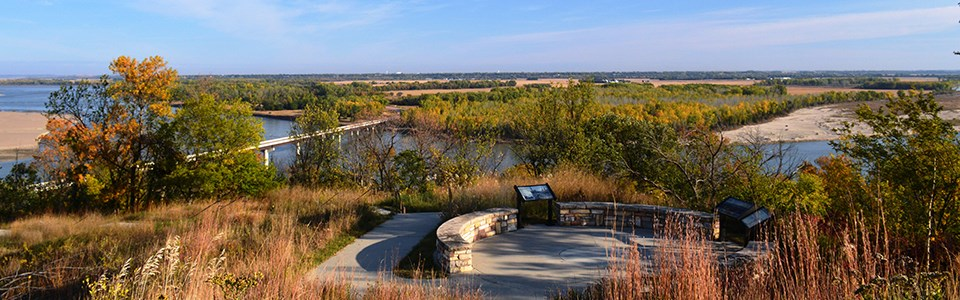
- Mulberry Bend Overlook, near the Vermillion–Newcastle Bridge in Dixon County, Nebraska

- Location within Nebraska Location within the United States
- Location: Nebraska and South Dakota, United States
- Nearest city: Yankton, South Dakota
- Coordinates: 42°51′45″N 97°23′34″W
- Area: 33,800 acres (13,700 ha)
- Established: November 10, 1978
- Governing body: National Park Service
- Website: Missouri National Recreational River

The Missouri National Recreational River is a National Recreational River located on the border between Nebraska and South Dakota. The designation was first applied in 1978 to a 59-mile section of the Missouri River between Gavins Point Dam and Ponca State Park. In 1991, an additional 39-mile section between Fort Randall Dam and Niobrara, Nebraska, was added to the designation. These two stretches of the Missouri River are the only parts of the river between Montana and the mouth of the Missouri that remain undammed or unchannelized. The last 20 miles of the Niobrara River and 6 miles of Verdigre Creek were also added in 1991.

The Missouri National Recreational River is managed by the National Park Service, with headquarters located in Yankton, South Dakota. Visitor centers are located at Ponca State Park, Niobrara State Park and the Lewis and Clark Visitor Center at Gavins Point Dam, overlooking Lewis and Clark Lake. It lies in parts of Boyd, Cedar, Dixon, and Knox counties in Nebraska, and Bon Homme, Charles Mix, Clay, Union, and Yankton counties in South Dakota.

== History ==
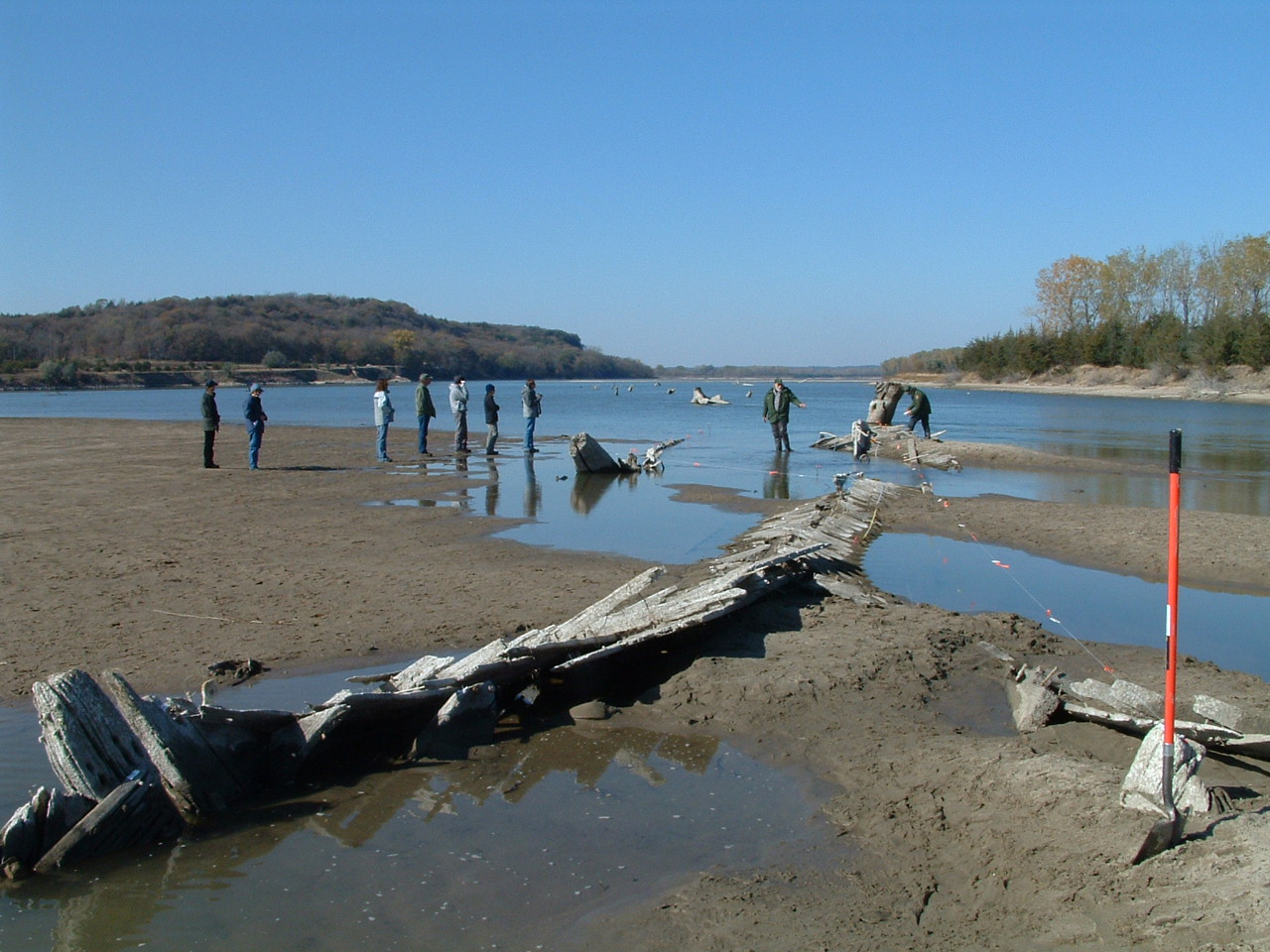
Wreck of the steamer North Alabama.

People have lived along the river for some 10,000 years. Archeologists have found their tools and weapons, homes, foods, religious, and ceremonial objects. The River is one of three historic east-west corridors, similar to the Oregon and Santa Fe trails. It was a pathway of American Indians, Lewis and Clark, trappers and traders, steamboat captains, and settlers. French and Spanish traders preceded Lewis & Clark's 1804 expedition. The Yellow Stone was the first steamboat to sail this stretch of the river in 1832 on the way to Fort Union Trading Post. The 1858 Treaty with the Yankton Sioux opened the southeastern portion of the Dakota Territory to white settlement. The Homestead Act of 1862 encouraged immigration into the region.

During the steamboat era, the Missouri was characterized by shifting channels, numerous braided channels, chutes, sloughs, islands, sandbars, and backwater areas. Well over 300 steamboats sank in the river between 1819 and 1920.

By the mid-20th century, extensive flooding prompted the passage of many flood control measures. The Flood Control Act of 1944 (the Pick–Sloan Plan) created the Fort Randall and Gavins Point dams, causing major changes to the river's hydrology and habitats.

== Flora and fauna ==
Along the river there are two major plant communities. The floodplain forest includes willow and cottonwood. The bluffs are covered by elm and oak. The annual floods create a variation of floodplain vegetation and succession throughout the park. New deposits such as sandbars and accretions adjacent to the riverbanks are covered with the pioneer species: annual weeds, short-lived grasses, sedges, and seedling willow and cottonwood. On higher above the water table, larger willow and cottonwood trees dominate. The floodplain forest includes larger cottonwoods on the highest banks and islands. The understory in the cottonwood forest is primarily dogwood, sumac, wild grape, and poison ivy. The sparse vegetation under the mature cottonwoods consists mostly of scouring rush, Kentucky bluegrass, smooth brome, and other invasive grasses and weeds.

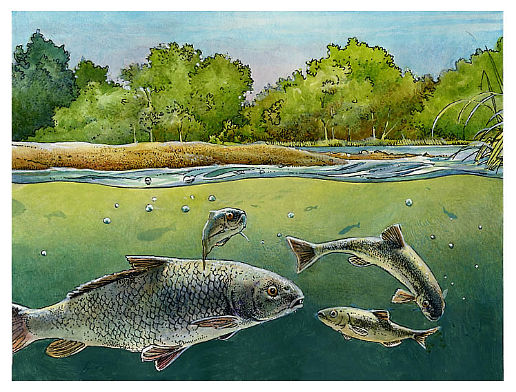
Shown in the cross-section of shallow water around a sandbar are sand shiners (Notropis stramineus), river carpsuckers (Carpiodes carpio), and/or plains minnows (Hybognathus placitus).

Above the floodplain, there is a mixed forest and agricultural fields. The forests on the adjoining bluffs are primarily hardwoods with the slopes covered by a dense growth of oak, ash, mulberry, and walnut, with burr oak as the dominant species.

Wildlife is plentiful. Since the days of Lewis and Clark the larger mammals have disappeared, including the grizzly bear, bison, and elk. Small mammals, including mice, voles, bats, rats, and ground squirrels make up the bulk of the species within the park. Deer are often seen on private property along the banks.

The American bald eagle has been gradually increasing throughout the park. Two other birds, the piping plover (northern Great Plains population) and the least tern (interior population), are still listed as threatened and endangered respectively. There are over 250 bird species identified within the riverway.

=== Threatened species ===
The National Park Service works alongside the U.S. Army Corps of Engineers and U.S. Fish and Wildlife Service to help manage habitat for threatened and endangered species, especially the Piping plover, Least tern, and Pallid sturgeon. Since the establishments of the dams on the Missouri River these species and their population numbers have decreased. Habitat restoration and resource protection measures have been in place to help rebound these numbers. Often during the summer months sandbars are signed as "Closed" to help protect critical habitat, fines and other penalties can be imposed for violators.

== Things to do ==
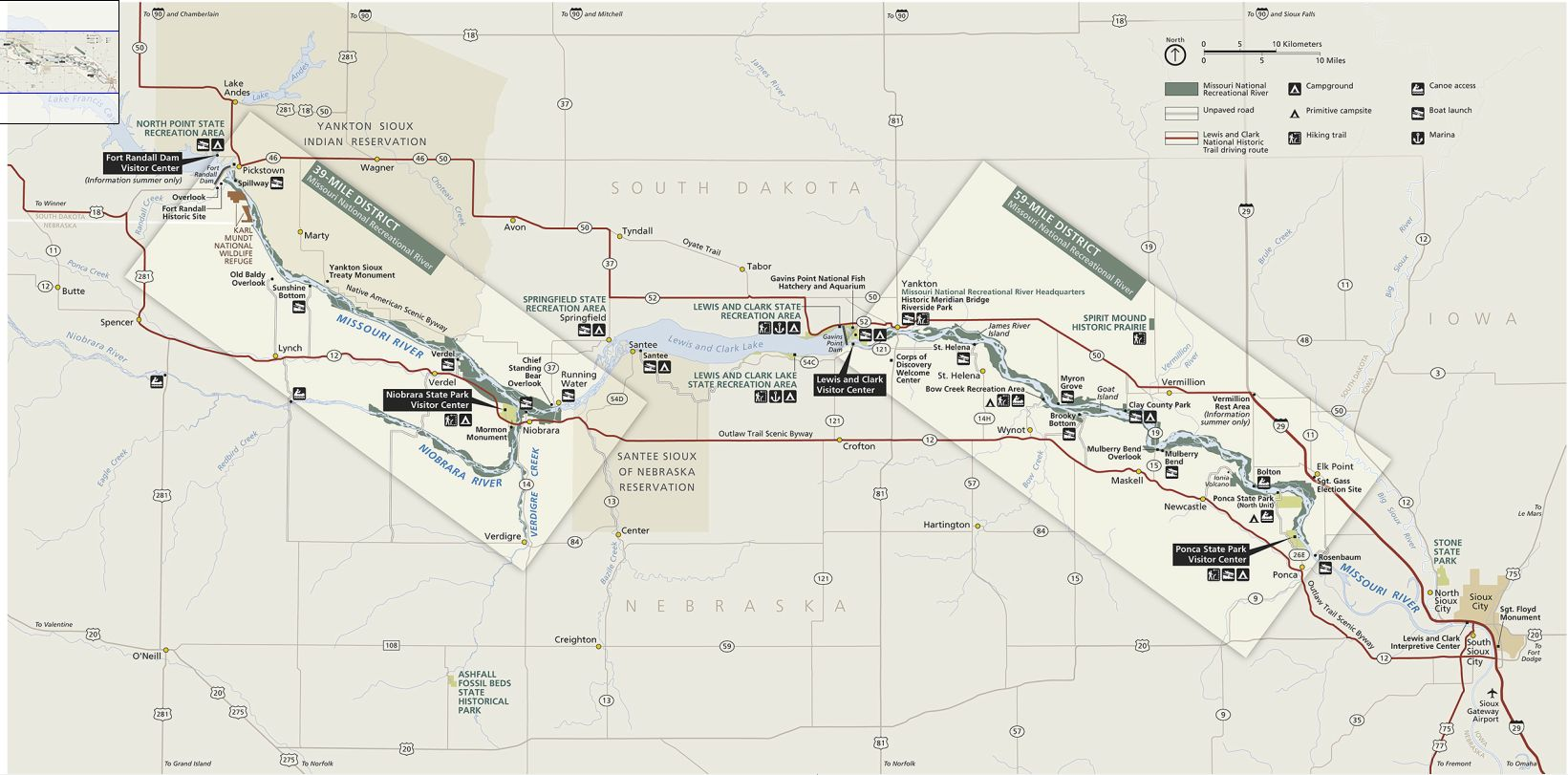
Map of Missouri National Recreational River

Recreational and educational opportunities abound at the Missouri National Recreational River. Fishing and hunting are popular actives. Walleye and catfish are the most popular species. Canoeing and kayaking are growing in popularity, and ranger-guided excursions are scheduled often during the summer.

=== Parks and recreation areas ===
As a "partnership park", the National Park Service (NPS) works closely with local and state agencies to help manage the recreational opportunities for the public.

- Goat Island, island located just downstream of Wynot, Nebraska and upstream of Vermillion, South Dakota. Development is currently under planning stages as of 2018, with development possibly including camping, trails, hunting, birding, and other public recreational opportunities. This decision was met with much objection from local river users. Public forums were held, and feedback was allegedly collected, but the plan moved on as proposed.
- Bow Creek Recreation Area, located near Wynot. Open to hunting, hiking, and river access. Over 30 acres of former farmland has been restored to native prairie and riverland bottom habitat.
- Mulberry Bend Overlook, located near Vermillion, near Nebraska Highway 15. The area has a scenic overlook of Mulberry Bend along the Missouri, along with a 3/4 mile hiking trail.
- Ponca State Park, located near Ponca, Nebraska maintains the Missouri National Recreational River Resource and Education Center. There are many events for outdoor education held annually that focus on the importance of the Missouri River and its history. Additionally, several campgrounds, multi-purpose trails, scenic overlooks, and river access are popular with the public.
- Niobrara State Park, located near Niobrara, Nebraska is located at the confluence of the Missouri and Niobrara Rivers. The park maintains several trails, cabins, campgrounds, and scenic overlooks.

=== Attractions and points of interest ===
- Spirit Mound Historic Prairie, near Vermillion, South Dakota.
- Meridian Highway Bridge, in Yankton, South Dakota.
- Gavins Point Dam, near Yankton, South Dakota.
- Lewis and Clark Lake, near Yankton, South Dakota.
- Fort Randall Dam, near Pickstown, South Dakota.
- Fort Randall, near Pickstown, South Dakota.
- Karl E. Mundt National Wildlife Refuge, near Pickstown, South Dakota.
- Chief Standing Bear Memorial Bridge, near Niobrara, Nebraska.
- Discovery Bridge, near Yankton, South Dakota.
- Vermillion–Newcastle Bridge, near Vermillion, South Dakota.

== See also ==
- National Wild and Scenic Rivers System
- List of National Wild and Scenic Rivers
- Lewis and Clark National Historic Trail
- Niobrara National Scenic River
- Pick–Sloan Missouri Basin Program
