= Lake Francis Case =

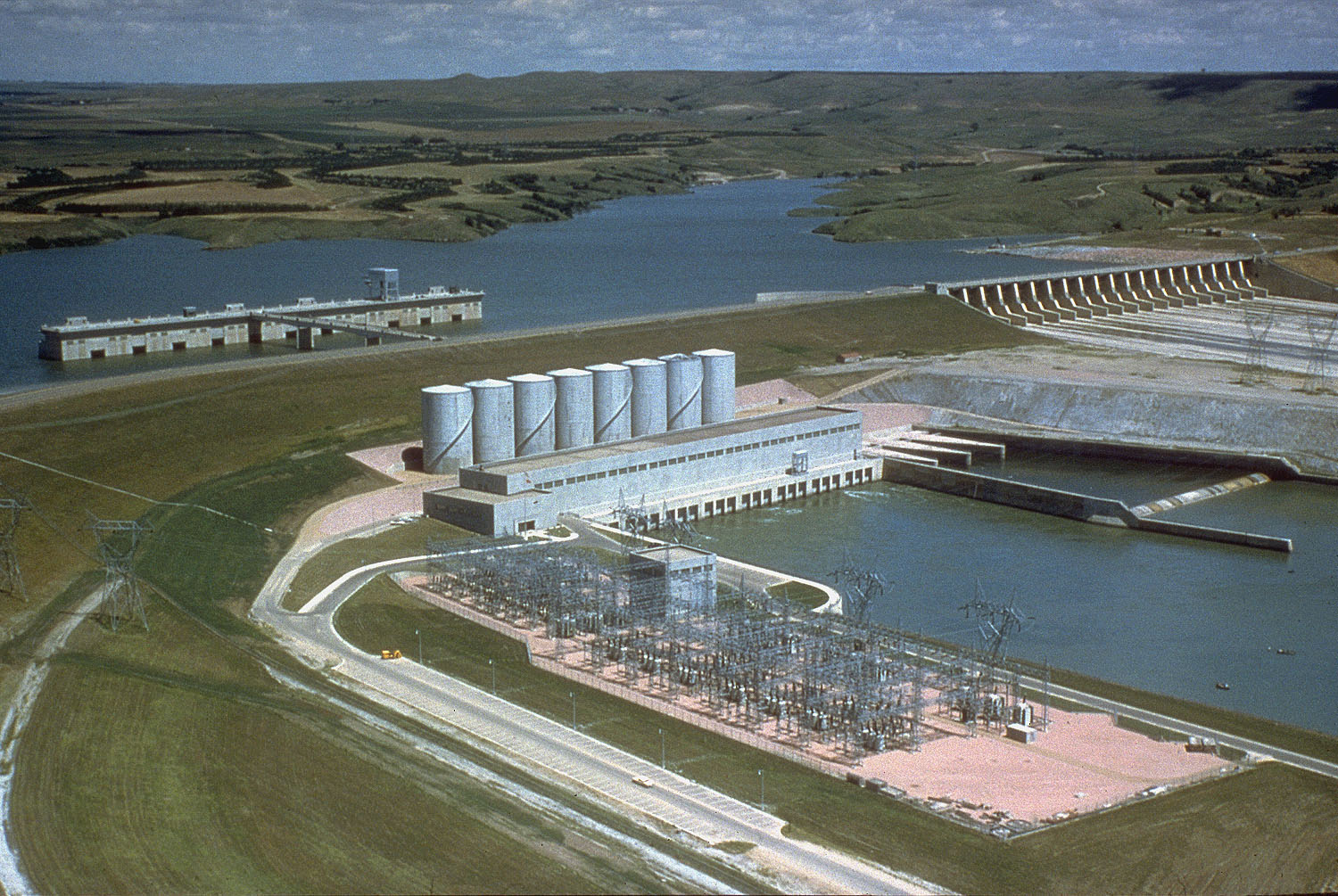
- Fort Randall Dam, with Lake Francis Case in the background

- Location within South Dakota Location within the United States
- Location: South Dakota, United States
- Coordinates: 43°03′35″N 98°33′43″W
- Type: Reservoir
- Primary inflows: Missouri River, White River
- Primary outflows: Missouri River
- Catchment area: 263,480 sq mi (682,400 km^{2})
- Basin countries: United States
- Max. length: 107 mi (172 km)
- Surface area: 102,000 acres (41,000 ha)
- Max. depth: 140 ft (43 m)
- Water volume: 5,700,000 acre⋅ft (7.0 km^{3})
- Shore length^{1}: 540 mi (870 km)
- Surface elevation: 1,355 ft (413 m)
- Settlements: Pickstown, Oacoma, and Chamberlain
- ^{1} Shore length is not a well-defined measure.

Lake Francis Case is a large reservoir impounded by Fort Randall Dam on the Missouri River in south-central South Dakota, United States. The lake has an area of 102,000 acres (410 km^{2}) and a maximum depth of 140 ft (43 m). Lake Francis Case has a length of approximately 107 mi (172 km) and has a shoreline of 540 mi (870 km). The lake is the eleventh-largest reservoir in the United States and is located within the counties of: Charles Mix, Gregory, Lyman, Brule, and Buffalo. The lake stretches from Pickstown, South Dakota upstream to Big Bend Dam.

The reservoir is named for former United States Senator Francis Higbee Case, of South Dakota.

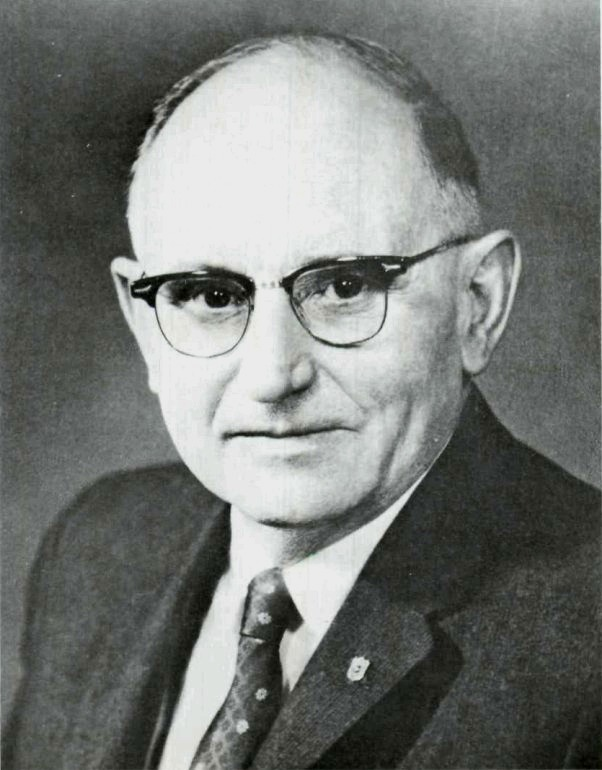
U.S. Senator (1951-1962) Francis H. Case of South Dakota, the lake's namesake.

== History ==
The Fort Randall Dam and concomitant reservoir were authorized by the Flood Control Act of 1944 and built next to a historic 1856 military base: Fort Randall. The dam began construction by the Army Corps of Engineers in 1946, and in 1954, its operation was inaugurated by then-President Dwight D. Eisenhower. The resulting reservoir, Lake Francis Case, flooded White Swan, a Native American settlement that had existed along the river. The population of the community was forced to move elsewhere, with many settling in Lake Andes, South Dakota. Lake Andes, nevertheless, experiences flooding.

== Fish and wildlife ==
Species of fish in the reservoir include walleye, northern pike, sauger, sunfish, yellow perch, common carp, black bullhead, channel catfish, and smallmouth bass.

Big game animals around the lake include whitetail and mule deer, coyotes and wild turkeys. Waterfowl and upland game birds include ducks, geese, pheasants, prairie chickens, and grouse. The Karl E. Mundt National Wildlife Refuge is located just downstream of the lake, as a sanctuary for wintering bald eagles. Bald eagles are commonly spotted around the dam during winter months.

== Recreation ==
The South Dakota Department of Game, Fish, and Parks (GFP) maintains several Lakeside Use Areas for lake access around the lake. In addition, the GFP operates seven State Recreation Areas on Lake Francis Case:

- North Point Recreation Area, near Pickstown
- Randall Creek Recreation Area, near Pickstown
- Pease Creek Recreation Area, near Geddes
- North Wheeler Recreation Area, near Geddes
- Platte Creek Recreation Area, near Platte
- Snake Creek Recreation Area, near Platte on South Dakota Highway 44
- Buryanek Recreation Area, near Burke
- American Creek Campground, near Chamberlain (City of Chamberlain Park)

== Lake crossings ==
Several major highways cross Lake Francis Case. South Dakota Highway 44 crosses over the lake between rural Charles Mix County and Gregory County on the longest bridge in South Dakota, and Interstate 90 crosses the reservoir between Chamberlain and Oacoma.

== See also ==
- List of lakes in South Dakota
