= Niobrara River Bridge (Niobrara State Park, Nebraska) =

- Formerly listed on the U.S. National Register of Historic Places
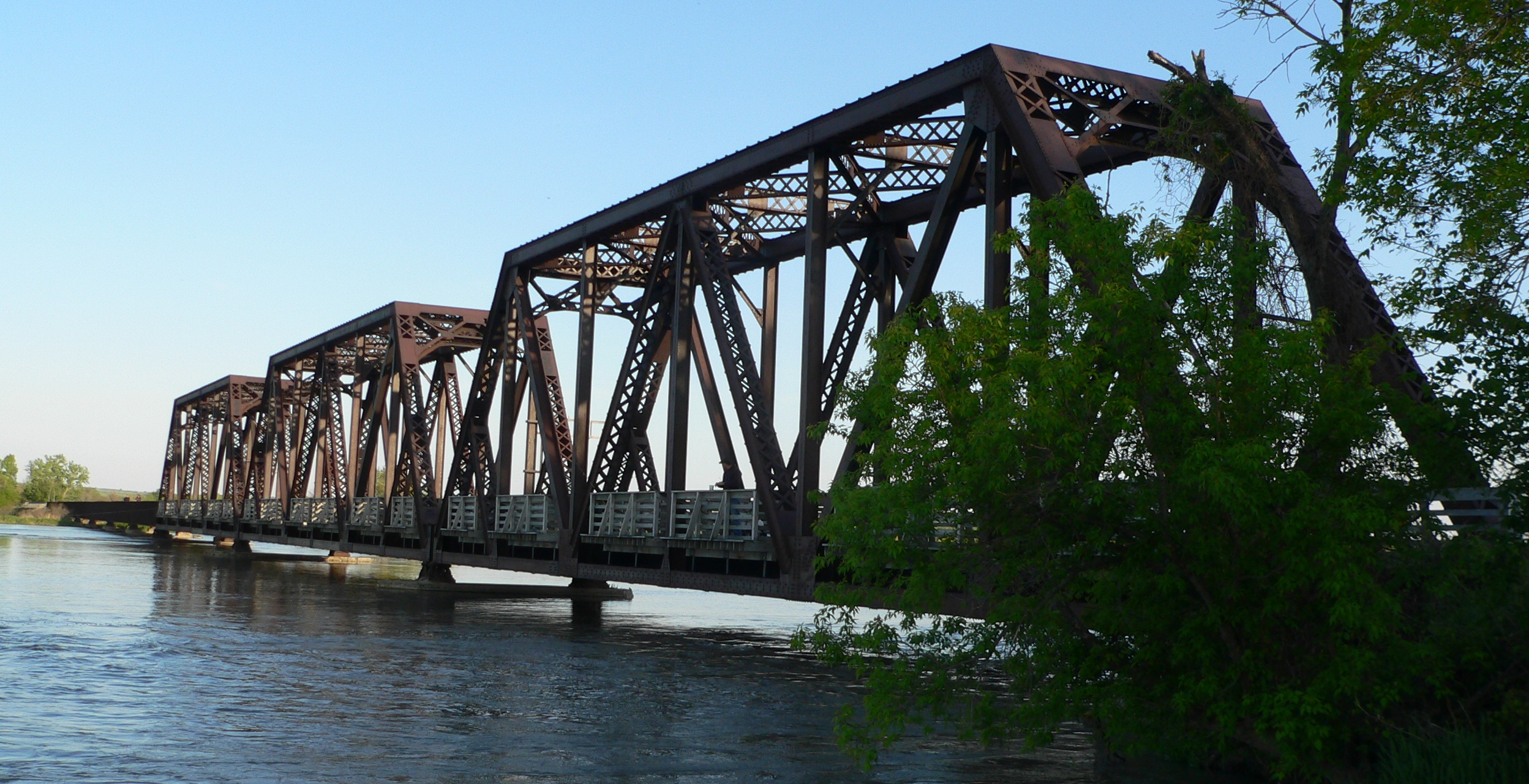

- Location within Nebraska Location within the United States
- Nearest city: Niobrara, Nebraska
- Coordinates: 42°46′0″N 98°2′55″W
- Area: less than one acre
- Built: 1929
- Built by: Chicago & North Western Railway
- Architectural style: Warren through truss
- NRHP reference No.: 92001576

Significant dates
- Added to NRHP: November 12, 1992
- Removed from NRHP: December 18, 2025

The Niobrara River Bridge is a triple-span railroad bridge over the Niobrara River in Niobrara State Park, Knox County, Nebraska, that was built in 1929.

It was listed on the National Register of Historic Places in 1992.

It is one of few multi-span railroad bridges in Nebraska.

In March 2019, a flood exacerbated by the collapse of the Spencer Dam upstream washed away six spans of the bridge, including one of the truss spans. The bridge is closed to the public.

== See also ==
- List of bridges on the National Register of Historic Places in Nebraska
- National Register of Historic Places listings in Knox County, Nebraska
