= Community Building =

Community building may refer to:

- Community building, a social process
- Community centre, a building used by the community

Community Building is also the name of the following individual buildings in the United States: (by state then city)

- Chester Masonic Lodge and Community Building, Chester, Arkansas, listed on the NRHP in Arkansas
- Judsonia Community Building Historic District, Judsonia, Arkansas, listed on the NRHP in Arkansas
- Mineral Springs Community Building, West Fork, Arkansas, listed on the NRHP in Arkansas
- Old Vero Beach Community Building, Vero Beach, Florida, listed on the NRHP in Florida
- Manchester Community Building, Manchester, Georgia, listed on the NRHP in Georgia
- Linton Township High School and Community Building, Pimento, Indiana, listed on the NRHP in Indiana
- Community Building (Columbus Junction, Iowa), listed on the NRHP in Iowa
- Community Building (Princeton, Iowa), listed on the NRHP in Iowa
- Douglass Township Community Building, Douglass, Kansas, listed on the NRHP in Kansas
- Shady Grove School and Community Building, DeRidder, Louisiana, listed on the NRHP in Louisiana
- Churchill Theatre-Community Building, Church Hill, Maryland, listed on the NRHP in Maryland
- South Range Community Building, South Range, Michigan, listed on the NRHP in Michigan
- Dawson Armory and Community Building, Dawson, Minnesota, listed on the NRHP in Minnesota
- Stockton Community Building, Stockton, Missouri, listed on the NRHP in Missouri
- Ponca Tribal Self-Help Community Building Historic District, Niobrara, Nebraska, listed on the NRHP in Nebraska
- Community Building (Ticonderoga, New York), listed on the NRHP in New York
- Community Building (Salisbury, North Carolina), listed on the NRHP in North Carolina
- Caddo Community Building, Caddo, Oklahoma, listed on the NRHP in Oklahoma
- Gould Community Building, Gould, Oklahoma, listed on the NRHP in Oklahoma
- Mangum Community Building, Mangum, Oklahoma, listed on the NRHP in Oklahoma
- Poteau Community Building, Poteau, Oklahoma, listed on the NRHP in Oklahoma
- Dunlap Community Building, Dunlap, Tennessee, listed on the NRHP in Tennessee
- Community Building (Sparta, Tennessee), listed on the NRHP in Tennessee
- Lewiston Community Building, Lewiston, Utah, listed on the NRHP in Utah
- Richmond Community Building, Richmond, Utah, listed on the NRHP in Utah
- Women's Christian Temperance Union Community Building, Morgantown, WV, listed on the NRHP in West Virginia
