= Ponca State Park =

Park in Nebraska, USA

- Location within Nebraska
- Location: Dixon County, Nebraska, United States
- Nearest city: Ponca, Nebraska
- Coordinates: 42°35′58″N 96°42′40″W
- Area: 2,123.63 acres (859.40 ha)
- Elevation: 1,345 ft (410 m)
- Established: 1934
- Administrator: Nebraska Game and Parks Commission
- Designation: Nebraska state park
- Named for: The Ponca people
- Website: Official website

Ponca State Park is a public recreation area located on the banks of the Missouri River four miles (6.4 km) north of Ponca, Nebraska, in the northeastern corner of the state. The state park's approximately 2,100 acres (850 ha) are situated among high bluffs and steep, forested hills adjacent to the Missouri National Recreational River. The park is managed by the Nebraska Game and Parks Commission.

== History ==
The park was created in 1934 when 160 acres (65 ha) of land were donated under the sponsorship of Ponca Legion Post 117. In 1934, the Civilian Conservation Corps began developing the site. The park and town bear the name of the Ponca tribe, who inhabited the area before European settlement, and whose chief, Standing Bear, won a celebrated court battle to have the Indian declared a "person" under U.S. law.

== Natural history ==
The park is noted for its biodiversity. Eastern woodland flowers such as bloodroot, Canada violet, phlox and sweet cicely can be found growing among prairie plants, including yucca, clover, and larkspur. The wild plum and gooseberry thickets were also noted by the Lewis and Clark Expedition, who passed these bluffs with their Corps of Discovery in the summer of 1804. Forested ravines and hillsides contain bur oak, basswood, elm, black walnut and hackberry. White-tailed deer and wild turkey are commonly seen. Coyotes, red and gray foxes, raccoons and bobcats might also be spotted. This area is also known for the concentrations of waterfowl that congregate during the spring and fall migrations. The barred owl is a vocal resident, and wintering bald eagles are often sighted.

== Activities and amenities ==
Twenty-two miles of hiking and biking trails wind through the deep ravines and hilltop ridges of the park. The Three State Overlook offers a scenic blufftop view of Nebraska, Iowa, and South Dakota. An interactive museum at park headquarters includes exhibits about the Missouri River and its history. The park offers a fishing pond, swimming pool, campgrounds, and cabins.
