= Lake Andes National Wildlife Refuge =

Lake in the state of South Dakota, United States

- IUCN category IV (habitat/species management area)
- Location within South Dakota Location within the United States
- Location: Charles Mix County, South Dakota, United States
- Nearest city: Lake Andes, SD
- Coordinates: 43°10′58″N 98°26′49″W
- Area: 5,638 acres (2,282 ha)
- Established: 1936
- Governing body: U.S. Fish and Wildlife Service
- Website: Lake Andes National Wildlife Refuge

Lake Andes National Wildlife Refuge is located in the U.S. state of South Dakota and includes 5,638 acres (22.81 km^{2}). The refuge is managed by the U.S. Fish and Wildlife Service and is part of the Lake Andes National Wildlife Refuge Complex. Only 938 acres (3.79 km^{2}) is under U.S. Government ownership with the rest being an easement to ensure greater habitat protection.

Lake Andes is a natural lake that is fed by underground springs and about every 20 years, the lake dries up. Two dikes separate the lake into three sections, allowing better water retention during the dry summers. Over one hundred species of birds nest here including Bald eagles, Ring-necked pheasant, Northern pintail and numerous species of ducks and geese.

Various mammal species inhabit the refuge, including White-tailed deer, coyote, and badger, muskrat which are all relatively common.

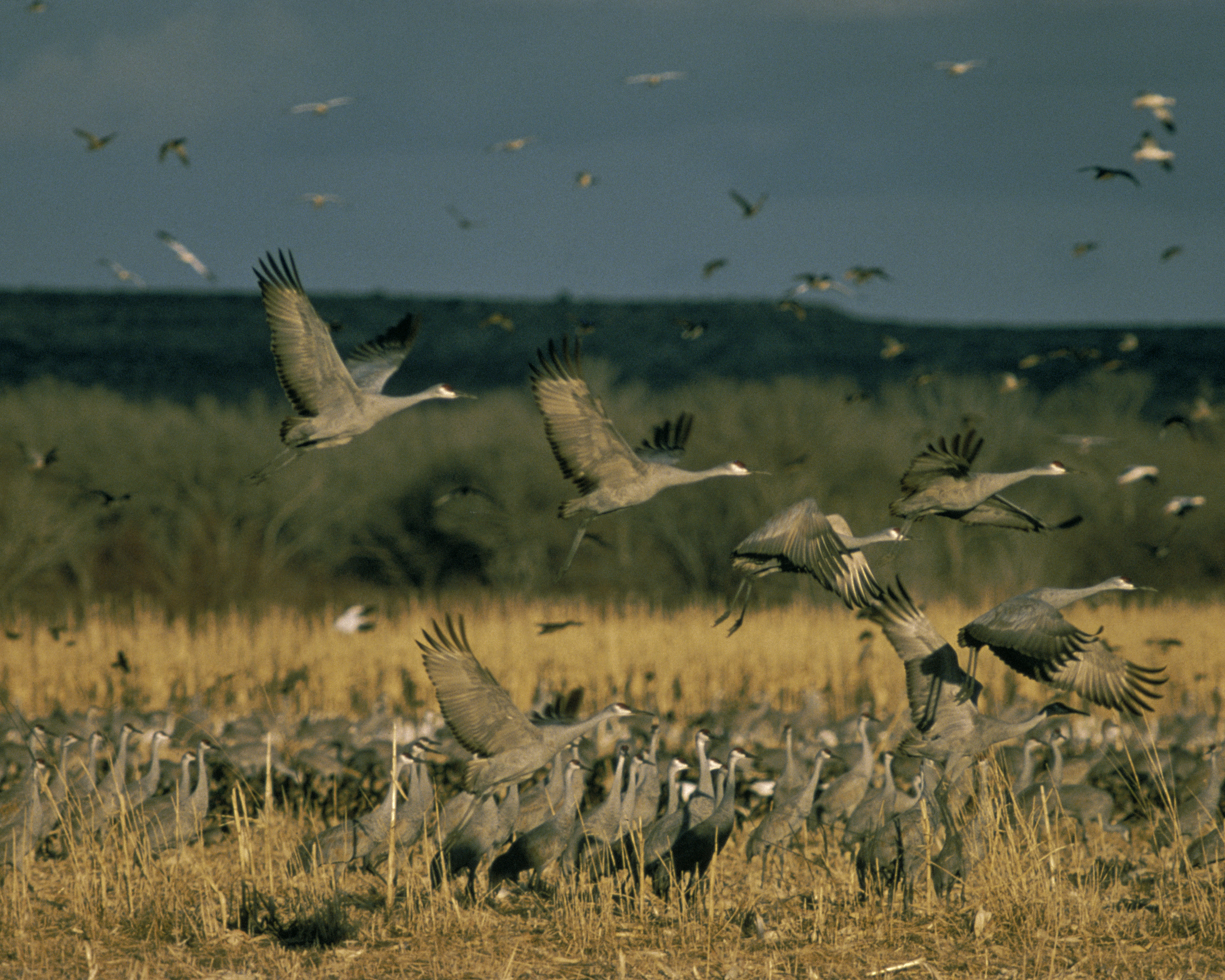
Sandhill cranes taking flight at Lake Andes National Wildlife Refuge.
