= Lake Andes Wetland Management District =

- IUCN category IV (habitat/species management area)
- Location within the United States
- Location: South Dakota, United States
- Nearest city: Lake Andes, SD
- Coordinates: 43°10′58″N 98°26′49″W
- Area: 82,731 acres (33,480 ha)
- Established: 1961
- Governing body: U.S. Fish and Wildlife Service
- Website: Lake Andes Wetland Management District

Lake Andes Wetland Management District is located in the U.S. state of South Dakota and includes 82,731 acres (334 km^{2}). The refuge is managed by the U.S. Fish and Wildlife Service. Of the land area in the district, the U.S. Government owns only 19,177 acres (77.6 km^{2}), while the remaining area is managed as an easement to help protect Waterfowl Production Areas from future development. The district oversees numerous wetland zones in an effort to ensure species protection. During Spring and Fall migration periods, tens of thousands of migratory birds can be found here, representing over 100 different species. The district is a part of the Lake Andes National Wildlife Refuge Complex. Bald eagles, northern pintail, mallards, snow geese, great grey owl, American kestrel, red-tailed hawk and prairie chicken are some of the more impressive bird species that can be found in the district.

Various mammal species inhabit the region, including white-tailed deer, coyote, and badger, muskrat which are all relatively common in the district.
