= James Tufts =

American politician

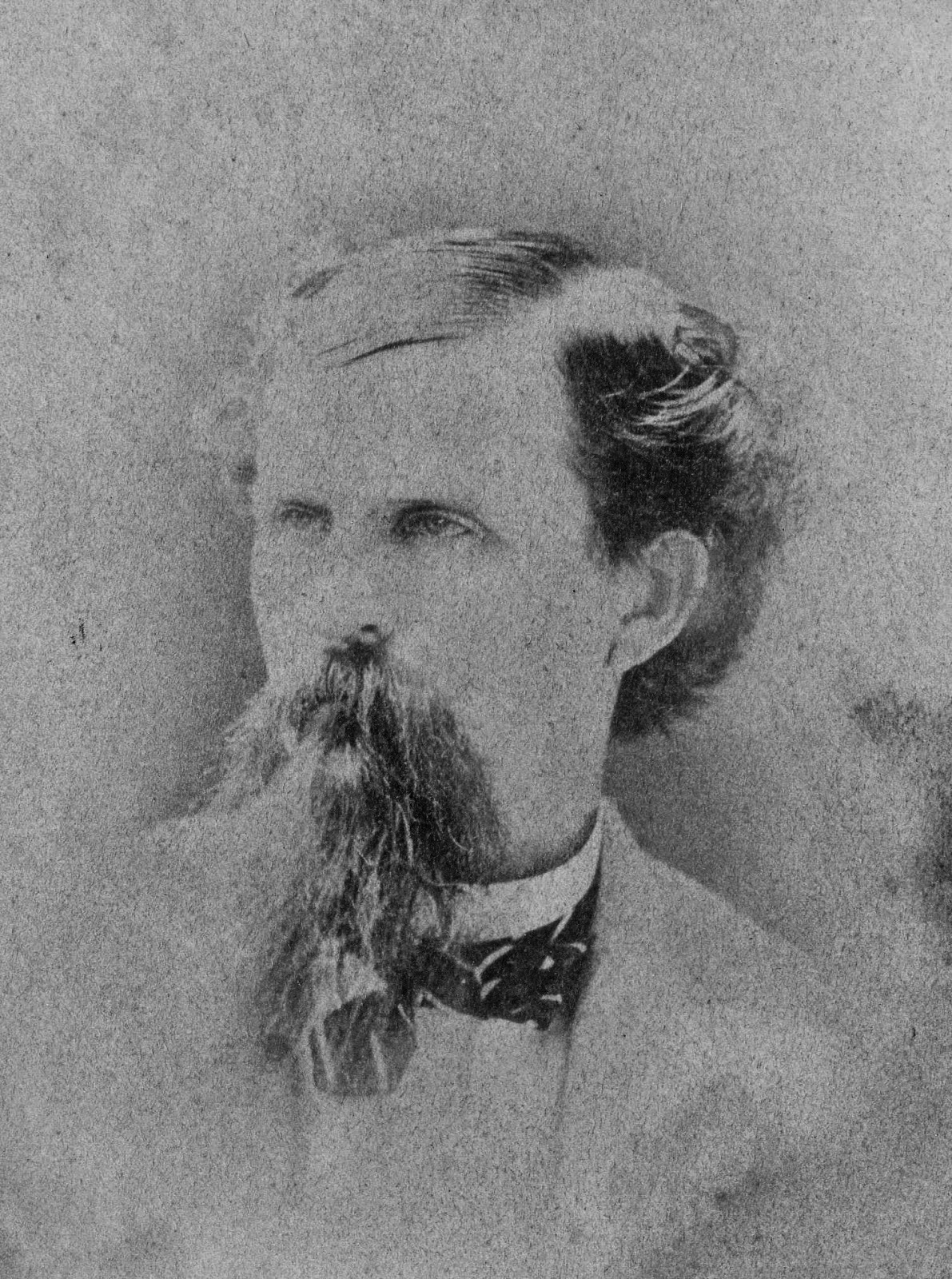

Acting Territorial Governor of Montana
- In office March 1869 – April 9, 1869
- Preceded by: Green Clay Smith
- Succeeded by: James Mitchell Ashley

1st Speaker of the Idaho Territorial House of Representatives
- Preceded by: office established

Member of the Idaho Territorial House of Representatives
- In office 1863–1867

Personal details
- Born: James Tufts; September 19, 1829 Charlestown, New Hampshire, U.S.
- Died: August 18, 1884 (aged 54) Niobrara, Nebraska, U.S.
- Resting place: L'Eau Qui Court Cemetery
- Party: Republican
- Education: Middlebury College
- Profession: Politician; lawyer; farmer

James Tufts (September 19, 1829 – August 18, 1884) was a United States politician and acting governor of Montana Territory in 1869.

== Biography ==
Born in Charlestown, New Hampshire, Tufts graduated from Middlebury College in 1855. He was admitted to the bar in 1857 and was an attorney in Iowa.

== Career ==
Tufts moved to Niobrara in the Nebraska Territory in 1859, where he became a probate judge and served in the territorial legislature. Tufts moved to the Dakota Territory in 1861 and served as secretary for the legislative council of the Dakota Territory. He was appointed US Commissioner to adjust military claims in the Dakota Territory in 1862.

Tufts moved to Idaho Territory in 1863 and served in the Idaho Territorial Legislature. He was the first Speaker of the Idaho Territorial House of Representatives.

Warrant of the Territory of Montana, issued 1 June 1868, signed by James Tufts as the Secretary of the Territory.

He was appointed territorial secretary for the Montana Territory in 1867, and served as its acting governor from March 1869 to April 9, 1869.

Tufts ran for the Montana territorial delegate to the United States House of Representatives and lost the election. He moved back to Niobrara, Nebraska, to farm and practice law.

== Death ==
Tufts died in Niobrara. He is buried in L'Eau Qui Court Cemetery.
