= Until Forever (film) =

- Directed by: Michael Linn
- Written by: Michael Linn
- Produced by: Bonnie Boyum; Carolyn Linn; Marc Linn
- Starring: Stephen Anthony Bailey; Madison Lawlor
- Cinematography: Shaun O'Connell
- Edited by: Marc Linn; Michael Linn
- Music by: Michael Linn; Chris Roman
- Production company: Linn Productions
- Distributed by: Vision Video; CanZion Films (Latin America)
- Release date: November 17, 2016 (Limited)
- Running time: 100 minutes
- Country: United States
- Language: English
- Budget: $150,000

Until Forever is a 2016 American independent biographical romantic drama film written and directed by Michael Linn and starring Stephen Anthony Bailey and Madison Lawlor. It is based on the life of Michael Boyum (1976-1999), a 22-year-old man from Inver Grove Heights, Minnesota who married his high school sweetheart, Michelle Larson, six weeks before he died of leukemia.

== Cast ==
- Stephen Anthony Bailey as Michael Boyum
- Madison Lawlor as Michelle Larson
- Jamie Anderson as Matthew Boyum
- James Stephens III as Mr. Fenton
- Melina Alves as Diana
- Susan Chambers as Bonnie Boyum
- Jess Coreau as Shirley Larson
- Dennis Linn as Dan Boyum
- Robert Kampa as Denny Larson

== Production ==
Filming took place in Hot Springs, South Dakota. The film was also shot in the Twin Cities. A scene was also filmed at the Meridian Highway Bridge.

== Reception ==
Edwin L. Carpenter of The Dove Foundation gave the film a positive review and wrote that it "features strong acting — especially that of Stephen Anthony Bailey as Michael and Madison Lawlor as Michelle — a tightly written script, and wonderful music."
