= Discovery Bridge (Yankton) =

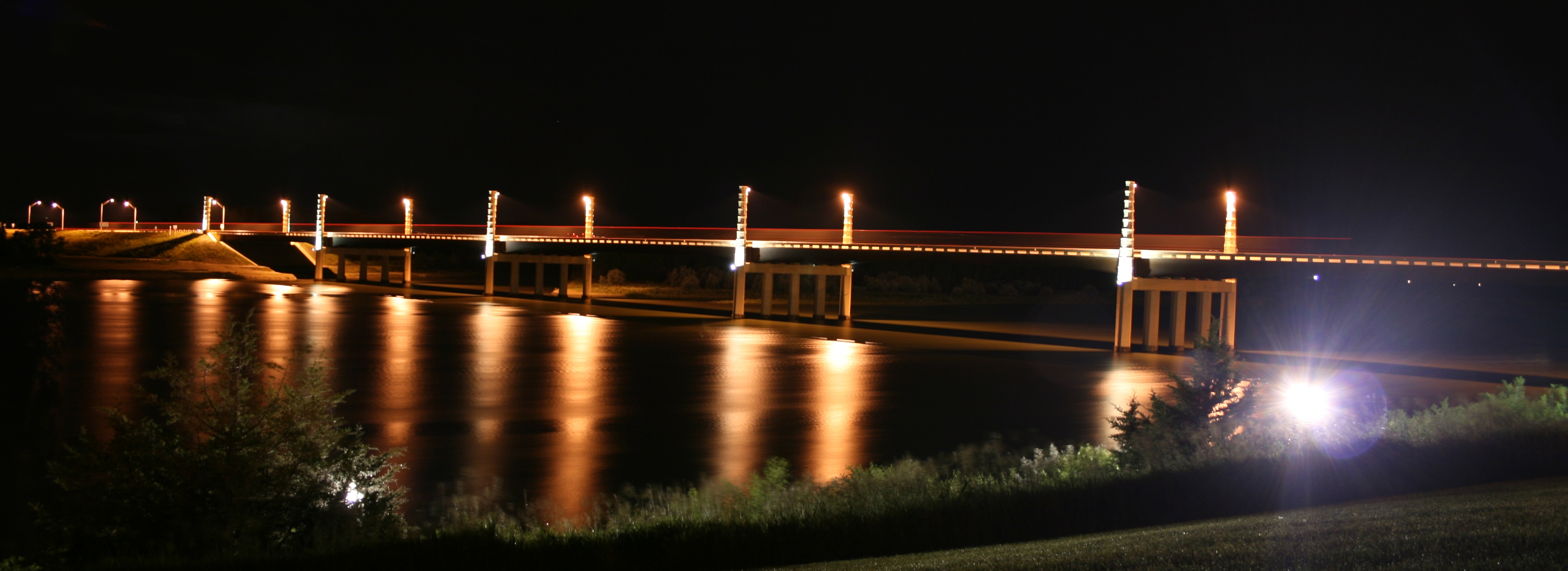
- Discovery Bridge at night
- Coordinates: 42°51′54.35″N 97°23′49.12″W
- Carries: 4 lanes on US 81
- Crosses: Missouri River
- Locale: Yankton, South Dakota / Cedar County, Nebraska
- Official name: Discovery Bridge
- Maintained by: South Dakota Department of Transportation and Nebraska Department of Transportation

Characteristics
- Width: 74 feet
- Longest span: 1590 feet

History
- Opened: October 11, 2008

The Discovery Bridge is a bridge that carries US Route 81 across the Missouri River from the Nebraska border to the South Dakota border. The Discovery Bridge connects Yankton, South Dakota, with rural Cedar County, Nebraska. The ribbon-cutting ceremony was on October 11, 2008, a year ahead of schedule. During the ceremony John McAuliffe and Kevin Brown inadvertently cut the ribbon prior to photographers being in place and thus there is no commemorative photo. The bridge crosses over the Missouri National Recreational River, a Federally-protected Wild & Scenic River, managed by the National Park Service

The Yankton SD Chamber of Commerce held a public contest to name the new bridge. The winning nomination would be the first public person to cross the bridge in a car the day of the bridge dedication.

More than 300 names were submitted. The public was then asked to vote their choice from 10 finalists.

The Discovery Bridge was the winning name submitted by David Spencer of Yankton, SD. The name is a reference to the Lewis and Clark expedition which was called the Corps of Discovery.

== History ==
Construction began on the Discovery Bridge in June 2007. The bridge then opened on October 11, 2008, which was exactly 84 years after the dedication of the Meridian Highway Bridge. Now completed, the Discovery Bridge serves as a replacement for the Meridian Highway Bridge, which is about 1,000 feet (300 m) downstream.

The bridge was a finalist in the 2009 America's Transportation Awards for "representing the best in innovative management, accountability and timeliness".

== See also ==
- List of crossings of the Missouri River
- Missouri River
- Missouri National Recreational River
- Gavins Point Dam
