= Fort Randall =

- U.S. National Register of Historic Places
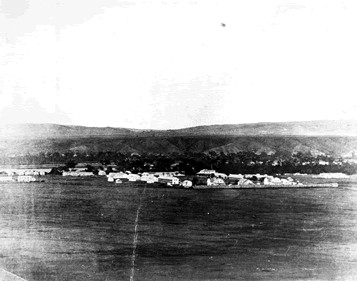
- Historic photo of Fort Randall

- Location within South Dakota Location within the United States
- Location: Gregory County, 3 mi. SW of Pickstown, South Dakota
- Nearest city: Pickstown, South Dakota
- Coordinates: 43.04919°N 98.56236°W
- Area: 200 acres (81 ha)
- Built: 1856
- NRHP reference No.: 76001735
- Added to NRHP: April 22, 1976

The Fort Randall Military Post was established in 1856 to help keep peace on the frontier. It was located on the south side of the Missouri River in South Dakota, just below the present site of the Fort Randall Dam.

== History ==
The site for the fort was selected in 1856 by General William S. Harney. The fort served as a strategic site on the river to defend two lines of transportation; it operated for 36 years. It was named for Colonel Daniel Randall, a career Army officer who also served as Deputy Paymaster General of the Army

Its strategic location along the Missouri River made it a key fort in two lines of western frontier defense. It was the last link in a chain of forts protecting the overland route along the Platte River. It was also the first fort in a chain of forts on the upper Missouri River. The most important mission assigned to the soldiers of Fort Randall was to mount expeditions to try to control the many Indian tribes on the Great Plains, primarily the Teton Sioux (Lakota people).

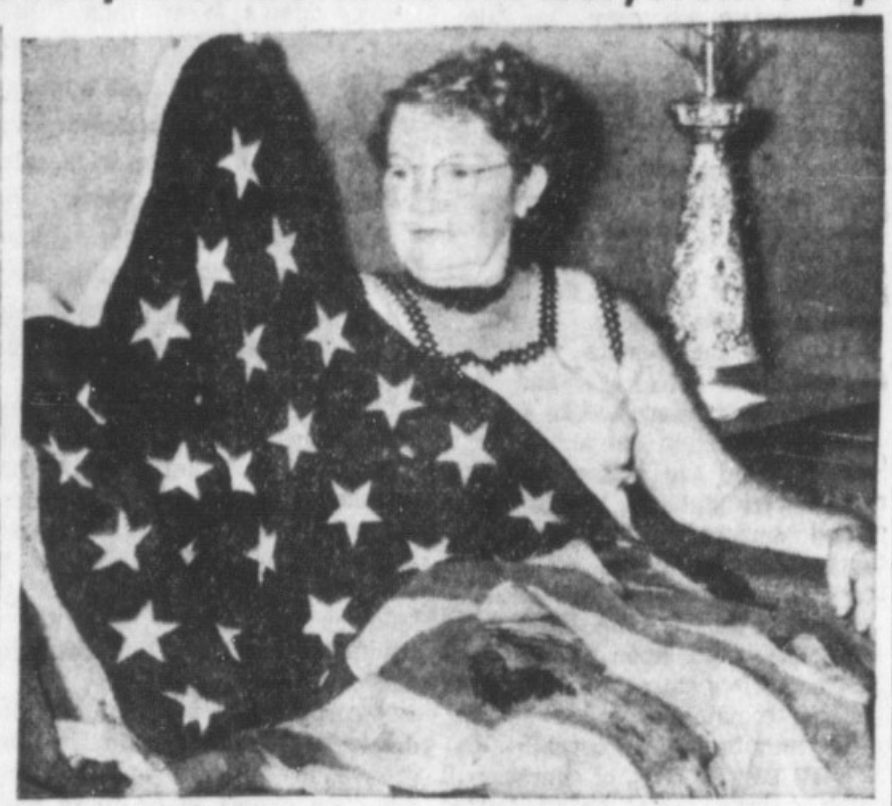
45 star American flag raised over the fort in 1885

After serving as an important base in the Indian Wars, Fort Randall closed in 1892.

Fort Randall is located in Gregory County, South Dakota at 43° 01' north latitude, 98° 37' west longitude (43.0244, -98.6242).

== Site today ==
The U.S. Army Corps of Engineers-Fort Randall Dam Project maintains the site which is open to the public. The fort's ruins are open for display with interpretive signage. In 2003, the Corps erected a stabilizing structure to help preserve the remains of the historic chapel.

== See also ==
- Fort Randall Dam
- Fort Randall Eagle Roost
- Missouri National Recreational River
- Randall Creek
