= Winnetoon Jail =

- U.S. National Register of Historic Places
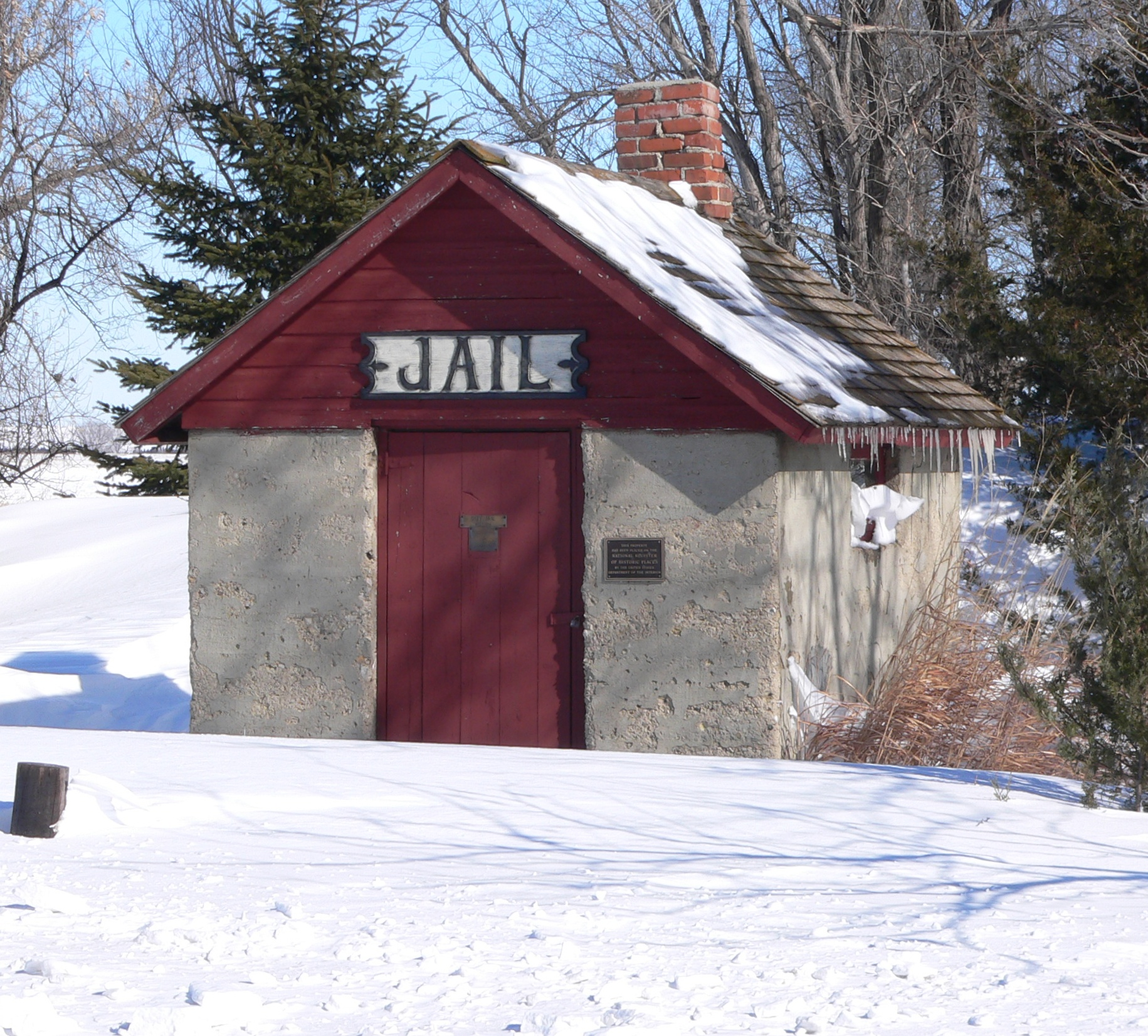

- Location within Nebraska Location within the United States
- Location: Jct. of First St. and Sherman Ave., Winnetoon, Nebraska
- Coordinates: 42°30′52″N 97°57′43″W
- Area: less than one acre
- Built: 1907
- Built by: P.C. Paulson Building Co.
- NRHP reference No.: 95000094
- Added to NRHP: February 27, 1995

The Winnetoon Jail in Winnetoon, Nebraska was built in 1907. It was listed on the National Register of Historic Places in 1995.

It was built for $37.00.
