= Fort Randall Eagle Roost =

Riparian ornithology site in the state of South Dakota, United States

- Location within South Dakota Location within the United States
- Location: Gregory County, South Dakota
- Coordinates: 43.0244°N 98.6242°W
- Basin countries: United States
- Surface area: 911 acres (3.69 km^{2})

U.S. National Natural Landmark
- Designated: 1967

Fort Randall Eagle Roost is a riparian ornithological site in Gregory County, South Dakota, United States. Located on the bank of the Missouri River, it is near the Fort Randall Dam and is also adjacent to the town of Pickstown. The water portion of the site, where the eagles catch fish, is owned by the United States federal government as part of the Missouri National Recreational River bed. The land portion of the site is owned by the private sector. The site was listed as a National Natural Landmark in 1967.

== Description ==
The National Park Service describes the Fort Randall Eagle Roost as follows:

A prime winter roosting area for bald eagles and golden eagles.

The upper Missouri River is a place where the bald eagle, the United States national bird, coexists with its western rival, the golden eagle.
