= Lake Andes National Wildlife Refuge Complex =

The Lake Andes National Wildlife Refuge Complex consists of the Lake Andes National Wildlife Refuge, the Lake Andes Wetland Management District, and the Karl E. Mundt National Wildlife Refuge in the states of Nebraska and South Dakota in the United States. Altogether, the complex manages 89,454 acres (362.01 km^{2}) of United States Government and conservation easement lands. The complex's headquarters are in Lake Andes, South Dakota, and it is administered by the United States Fish and Wildlife Service.
