= Karl E. Mundt National Wildlife Refuge =

Protected area in South Dakota, United States

- IUCN category IV (habitat/species management area)
- Location within South Dakota Location within Nebraska Location within the United States
- Location: Gregory County, South Dakota / Boyd County, Nebraska, United States
- Nearest city: Pickstown, SD
- Coordinates: 43°1′16″N 98°31′53″W
- Area: 1,085 acres (439 ha)
- Established: December 19, 1974
- Governing body: U.S. Fish and Wildlife Service
- Website: Karl E. Mundt National Wildlife Refuge

Karl E. Mundt National Wildlife Refuge is located mostly in the southern part of the U.S. state of South Dakota, with a small extension into northern Nebraska, and includes 1,085 acres (4.39 km^{2}) The refuge is a part of the Lake Andes National Wildlife Refuge Complex and is managed by the United States Fish and Wildlife Service. Of the land area in the district, the United States Government owns only 780 acres (3.15 km^{2}), while the remaining area is managed as a conservation easement. The refuge is closed to the public but there are excellent viewing locations from the Fort Randall Dam on the Missouri River. The Karl E. Mundt NWR has the largest concentration of bald eagles in the lower 48 states, with over 200 eagles often spending the winter on the refuge. The refuge was named for former South Dakota Senator Karl Mundt, who was a strong supporter of the Endangered Species Act of 1966.

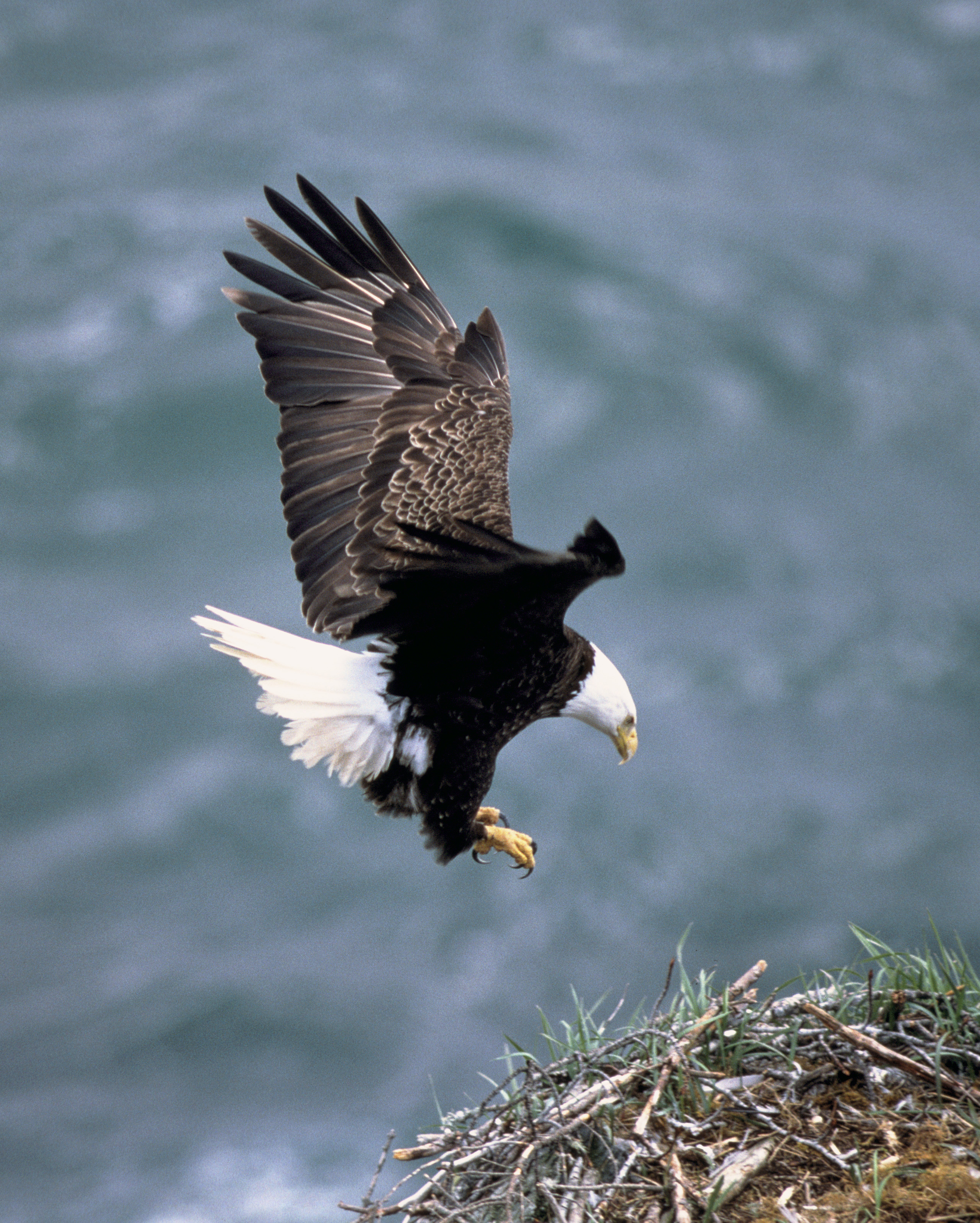
Bald eagle about to land. Bald eagle females are slightly larger than males and can have an 8 ft (2.43 m) wingspan and weigh between 10 and 14 lb (4.53-6.35 kg)

The Karl E. Mundt NWR is centered on an area below the Fort Randall Dam which is located on the Missouri River, and is maintained by the United States Army Corps of Engineers.

== Wildlife ==
An abundance of fish such as shad and white bass and a variety of ducks and geese in the refuge are major attractions to bald eagles that consume fish, reptiles, and other birds as a part of their normal diet. The riverbanks in the area are thick with massive cottonwood trees that provide ideal nesting habitat for bald eagles and also shelter them from the cold winter winds of the Great Plains. By 1967, the number of bald eagles that were found to be wintering below the dam was 238, which was the largest concentration of this species anywhere in the lower 48 states at that time. The National Park Service then proclaimed the area as a National Natural Landmark, setting the stage for protection. In an effort to purchase private land and help to protect habitat for the bald eagle, 7-Eleven Food Stores and the National Wildlife Federation worked out a "cause marketing" program in which proceeds from the sale of endangered species drinking cups sold at 7-Eleven stores, was donated to the National Wildlife Federation. With the 250,000 dollars raised, the National Wildlife Federation then purchased the land and donated it to the U.S. Government and the U.S. Fish and Wildlife Service on December 19, 1974. The bald eagle was placed on the endangered species list in 1976 and after almost 20 years of strict protection, the population of these birds increased sufficiently for them to be relisted as a threatened species. As of 2006, an estimated 90,000 bald eagles are believed to exist in the wild.

Though the refuge is closed to the public, bird watching is available from the Fort Randall Dam and a kiosk there provides information for the best times and locations for viewing various species. The bald eagle is best seen during the winter, especially between the months of November to March, and are uncommon for most of the rest of the year, though a few nesting pairs remain on the refuge year round. Generally, the harshest winters have the largest concentrations of eagles, as they prefer to be near to a readily available food source to maximize calorie intake. Over 200 other species of birds have been spotted here including White pelicans, Franklin's gull and Double-crested cormorants . White-tailed deer, Mule deer, coyotes, bobcat, skunk and mink are but a few of the 50 species of mammals observed in the refuge. Plans to expand the refuge are nearing final approval and it is hoped that another 2,000 acres (8.09 km^{2}) may be added.
