= Niobrara State Park =

Park in Nebraska, United States

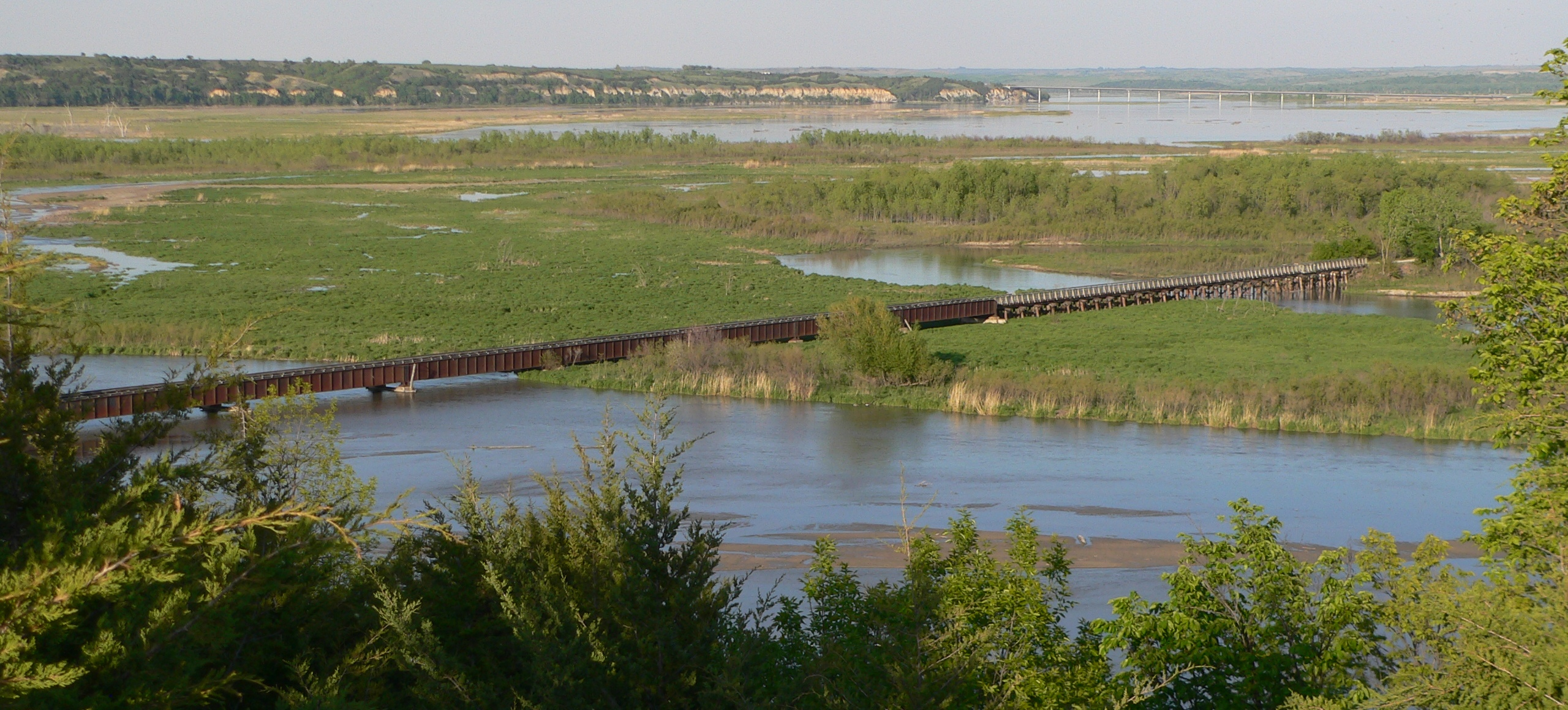
- Niobrara River Bridge

- Location within Nebraska
- Location: Knox County, Nebraska, United States
- Nearest town: Niobrara, Nebraska
- Coordinates: 42°45′58″N 98°2′50″W
- Area: 1,236.59 acres (500.43 ha)
- Elevation: 1,211 ft (369 m)
- Established: 1987 (originally Niobrara Island State Park, est. 1930)
- Administrator: Nebraska Game and Parks Commission
- Visitors: 132,950 (in 2018)
- Designation: Nebraska state park
- Website: Official website

Niobrara State Park is a public recreation area located at the confluence of the Missouri and Niobrara rivers in the northeast corner of Nebraska. The state park occupies river bluffs to the west of the village of Niobrara and the Niobrara River. The park includes the Niobrara River Bridge, a decommissioned railroad bridge listed on the National Register of Historic Places. The park is managed by the Nebraska Game and Parks Commission.

== History ==
The first state park at the mouth of the Niobrara River was called Niobrara Island State Park. Niobrara Island had been a Niobrara town park until it was transferred to the state in 1930. Both the state and the Civilian Conservation Corps made improvements to the site in the 1930s. The park's present-day site opened in 1987 after the Nebraska Game and Parks Commission purchased 1,231 acres of higher land to the west of the original park. Cabins at the old park that were still in use in 1987 were subsequently abandoned because of high water in the area. The park opened to the public on June 26, 1987, and was formally dedicated in a ceremony on 11 July.

== Activities and amenities ==
Park facilities include a swimming pool and interpretive center. Visitors can tour the park via seven miles (11 km) of roads and fourteen miles (23 km) of hiking trails. The park offers RV and primitive camping as well as cabins that overlook the river. White-tailed deer and wild turkeys roam the park by day while at night coyotes and whip-poor-wills mingle their cries and calls.
