= Meridian Highway Bridge =

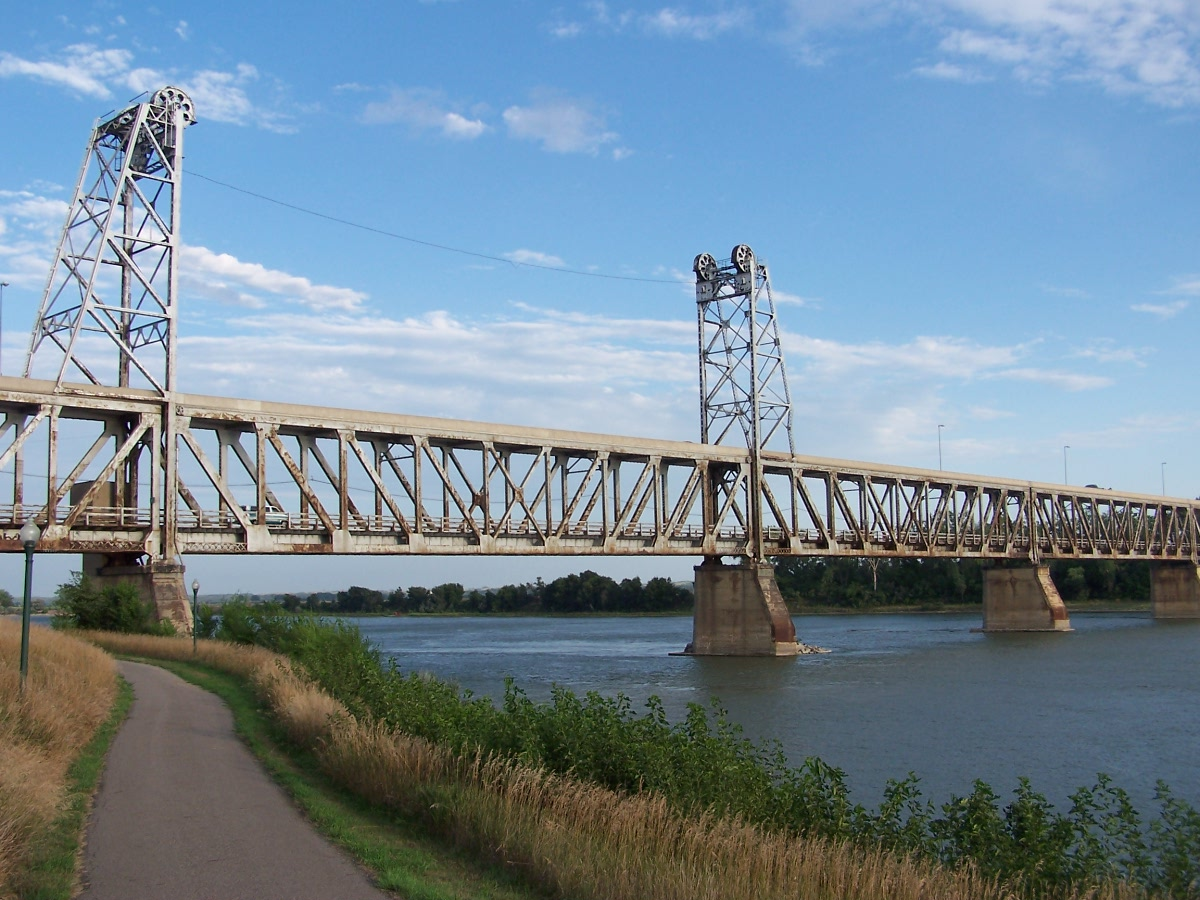
- Meridian Bridge as seen from Yankton trail.
- Coordinates: 42°51′53″N 97°23′38″W
- Carries: pedestrians, previously 2 lanes of US 81
- Crosses: Missouri River
- Locale: Yankton, South Dakota and Cedar County, Nebraska
- Official name: Meridian Highway Bridge
- Maintained by: City of Yankton, South Dakota

Characteristics
- Design: Vertical lift bridge double deck, Pratt through truss
- Total length: 3,013 ft (918 m)
- Width: 33 ft (10 m)
- Longest span: 1,668 feet
- Clearance below: feet

History
- Opened: 1924
- Meridian Bridge
- U.S. National Register of Historic Places
- Location within Nebraska Location within the United States
- Nearest city: South Yankton, Nebraska
- Coordinates: 42°51′52.47″N 97°23′38.31″W
- Area: 2.4 acres (0.97 ha)
- Architectural style: Prat vertical-lift truss
- MPS: Highway Bridges in Nebraska MPS
- NRHP reference No.: 93000537
- Added to NRHP: June 17, 1993

Location
- Interactive map of Meridian Highway Bridge

The Meridian Highway Bridge is a bridge that formerly carried U.S. Route 81 across the Missouri River between Nebraska and South Dakota. The Meridian Highway Bridge connects Yankton, South Dakota with rural Cedar County, Nebraska. The Meridian Bridge is a double-deck bridge, with the top level having carried traffic into South Dakota from Nebraska, and the lower level having carried traffic into Nebraska from South Dakota. It was closed to all traffic in 2008, but reopened for use only by pedestrians and bicycles in 2011.

== History ==
The bridge crosses the Missouri River, connecting Yankton, South Dakota to the north with Cedar County, Nebraska to the south. Prior to the construction of the bridge, traffic moved between these two points via a ferry service, started in 1870, and a seasonal pontoon bridge, first installed in 1890. The pontoon bridge was disassembled and rebuilt twice a year, once to float on open water, and once to be placed on solid ice. After a 1915 initiative to build a permanent bridge faltered with the U.S. entrance into World War I, a new effort was started by the Yankton Chamber of Commerce 1919. Though fundraising problems caused a temporary halt in 1922, the new bridge, featuring a movable span to allow for river navigation, was completed during the summer of 1924.

The dedication ceremony was held on October 11, 1924, and the bridge opened as a toll bridge. It was the last link of the Meridian Highway, which became U.S. Route 81, to be completed. It was designed for use by trains on the lower level of the bridge and vehicular traffic on the upper level; a lift mechanism allowed river traffic to pass below. However, trains never used the lower level. In 1953, all tolls were lifted and the two levels were converted to one-way traffic: northbound on the top, southbound on the bottom. In the 1980s, the lift mechanism and counterweights were removed, and the decorative iron railings on the upper level were replaced by Jersey barricades.

The bridge was added to the National Register of Historic Places in 1993.

On May 9, 2008, a 10-ton gross weight limit was placed on the bridge after an inspection found corrosion on the gusset plates. It was replaced by the Discovery Bridge upon its opening on October 11, 2008, exactly 84 years after the dedication of the Meridian Highway Bridge.

The bridge was used as location for filming a scene of the 2016 film Until Forever.

== Present and future use ==
With completion of the Discovery Bridge, the Meridian Bridge has been converted into a pedestrian/bike trail. The bridge reopened in November 2011 to non-motorized traffic only. A two-block-long pedestrian plaza has been added.

The bridge spans the Missouri National Recreational River, a unit of the National Park Service created under the Wild and Scenic Rivers Act.

== See also ==
- List of crossings of the Missouri River
- Missouri National Recreational River
- List of bridges on the National Register of Historic Places in Nebraska
- List of bridges on the National Register of Historic Places in South Dakota
- National Register of Historic Places listings in Cedar County, Nebraska
- National Register of Historic Places listings in Yankton County, South Dakota
- Discovery Bridge (Yankton)
- List of historic bridges in Nebraska
- Gavins Point Dam
