= Vermillion–Newcastle Bridge =

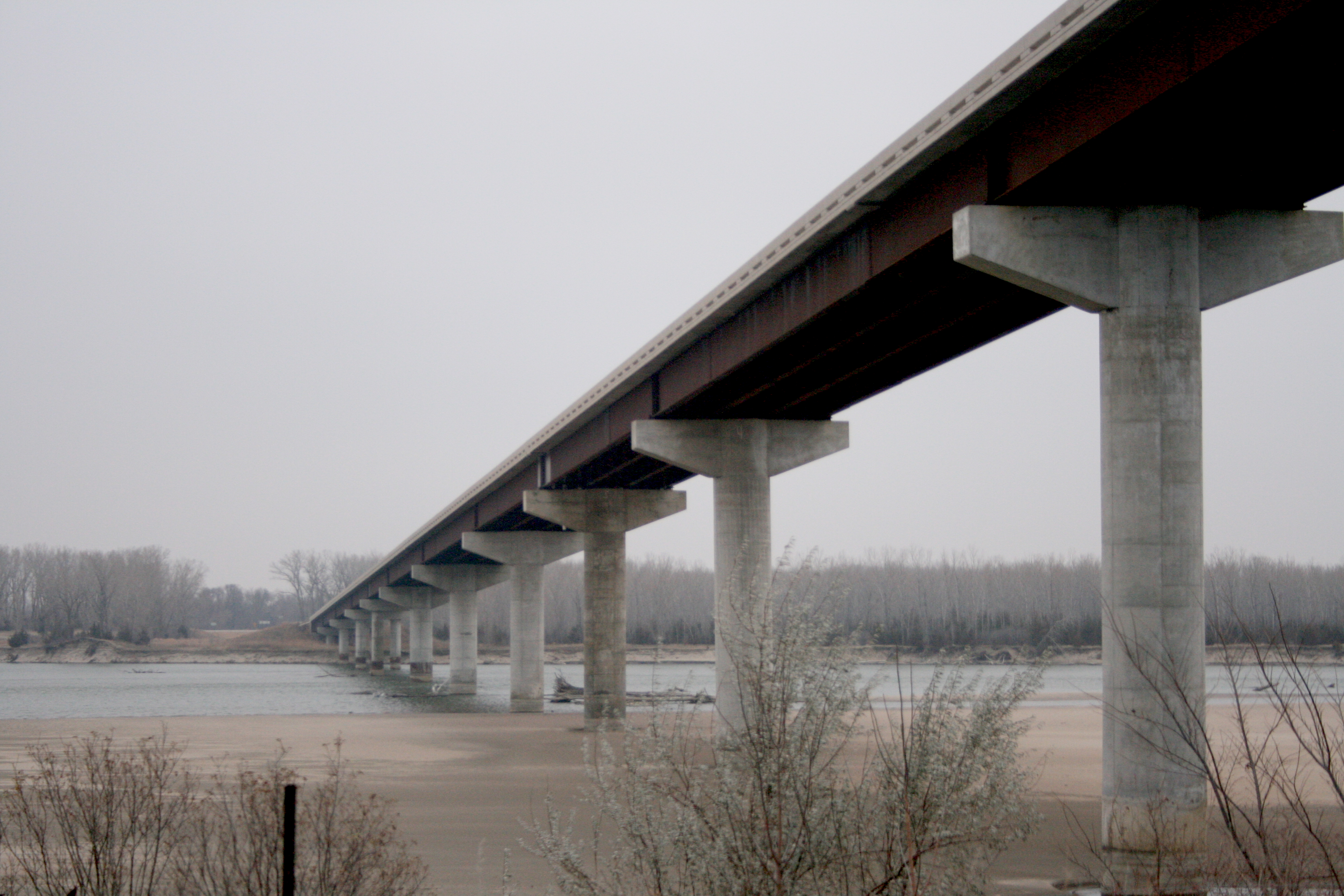
- Coordinates: 42°43′07″N 96°57′03″W
- Carries: 2 lanes of N-15/ SD 19
- Crosses: Missouri River
- Locale: South Dakota and Nebraska
- Official name: Vermillion-Newcastle Bridge
- Maintained by: Nebraska Department of Transportation and South Dakota Department of Transportation

Characteristics
- Total length: 765 m
- Width: 11 m
- Longest span: 70 m

History
- Opened: 2001

The Vermillion–Newcastle Bridge is a Nebraska and South Dakota Border crossing of the Missouri River. It joins Nebraska Highway 15 to South Dakota Highway 19.

The Dedication Ceremony was held on November 10, 2001. The dedication ceremonies were held on the Nebraska side of the bridge at the overlook.

The bridge crosses the Missouri National Recreational River, a unit of the National Park Service (NPS). The NPS maintains the Mulberry Bend Overlook on the Nebraska side of the bridge with scenic overlooks and a 3/4 mile trail along the Missouri River.

== See also ==
- Missouri National Recreational River
- List of crossings of the Missouri River
