= Ponca Tribal Self-Help Community Building Historic District =

Historic district in Nebraska, United States

- U.S. National Register of Historic Places
- U.S. Historic district
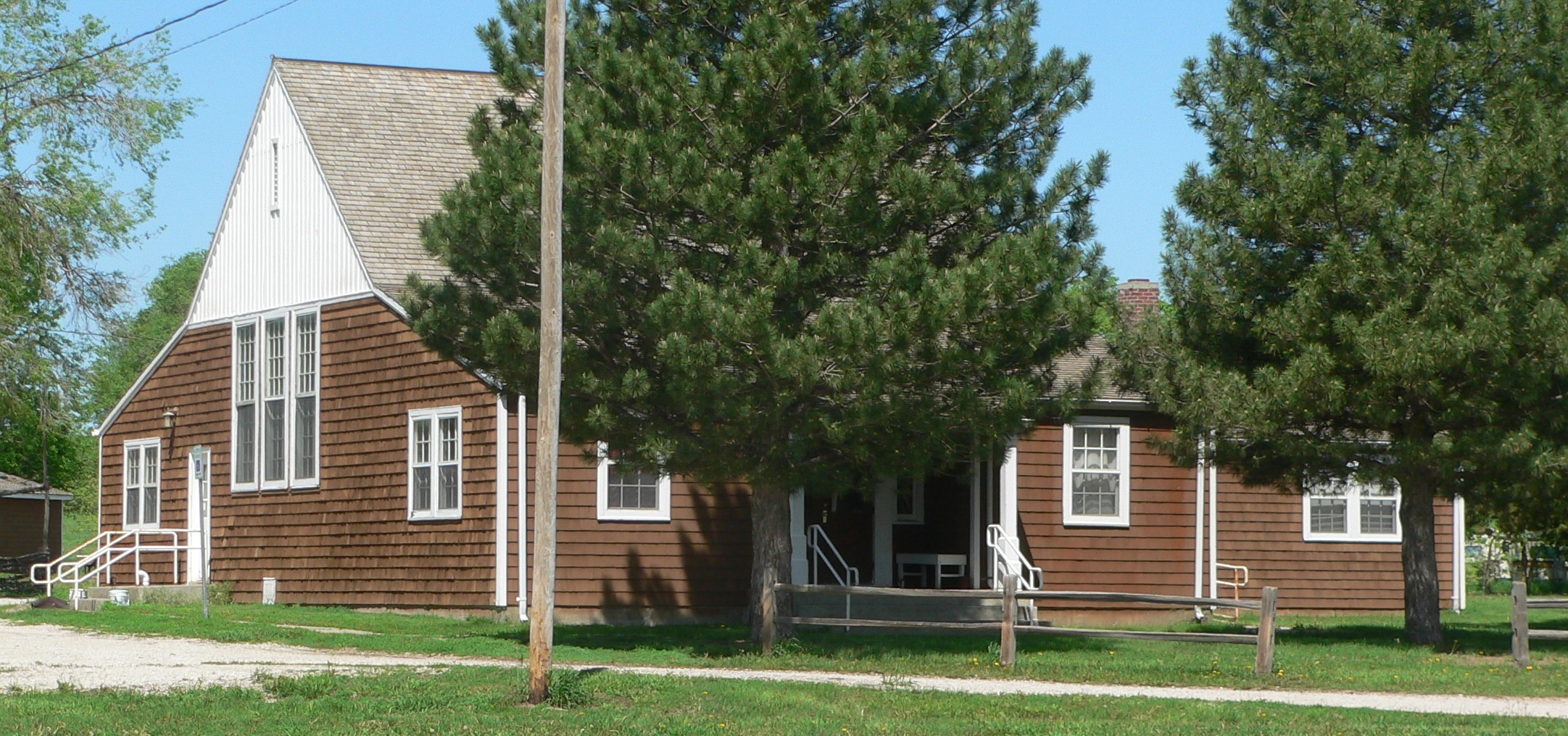
- Ponca Tribal Self-Help Community building

- Location within Nebraska Location within the United States
- Location: 88915 521 Avenue; approximately 3 miles southeast of Niobrara, Nebraska
- Coordinates: 42°42′51″N 98°5′12″W
- Area: 5 acres (2.0 ha)
- Built: 1936
- NRHP reference No.: 03000106
- Added to NRHP: March 13, 2003

The Ponca Tribal Self-Help Community Building Historic District, with the Ponca Agency Building, was listed on the National Register of Historic Places in 2003.

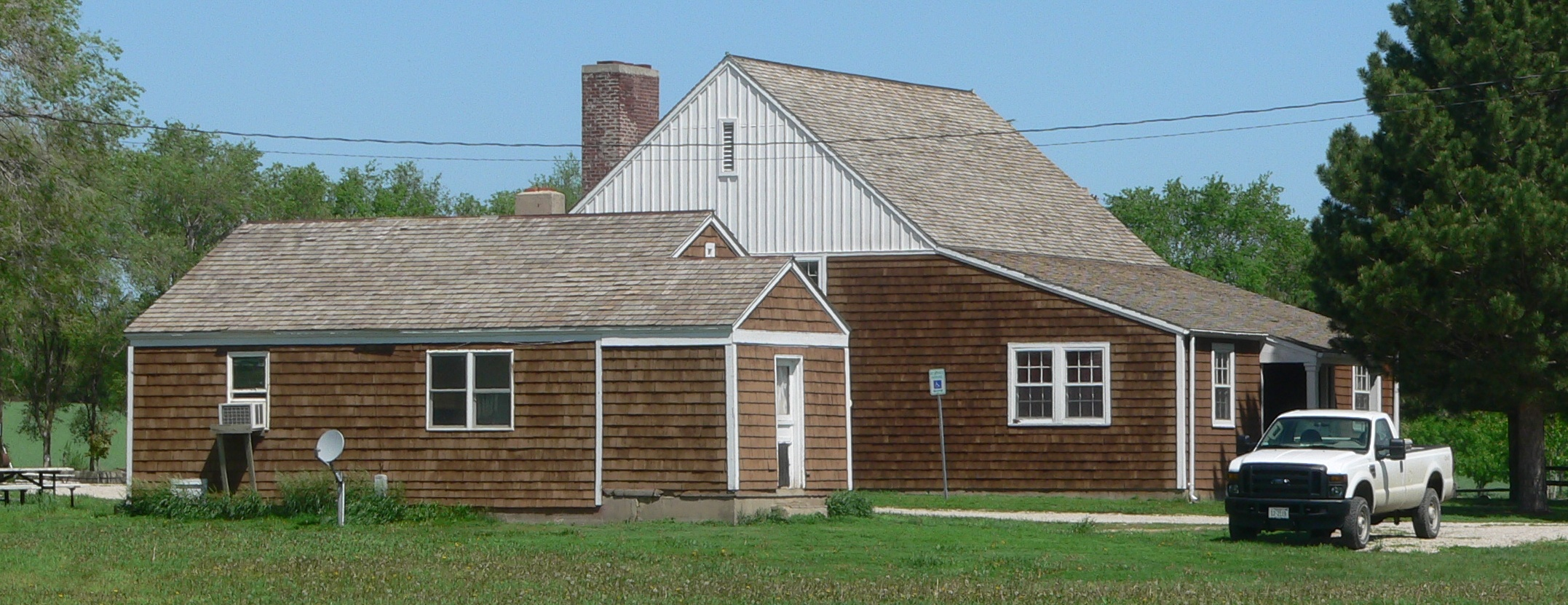
Caretaker's cottage, at left, with main building behind

The 5-acre (2.0 ha) historic district includes two contributing buildings: the Ponca Tribal Self-Help Community building and a caretaker's cottage, both built in 1936. It also includes five contributing structures and one contributing site.

The building construction was funded by the Indian Emergency Conservation Work (IECW) program, sometimes termed the "Indian CCC", less well known than the related Civilian Conservation Corps (CCC) program. The IECW was a program of the Bureau of Indian Affairs.

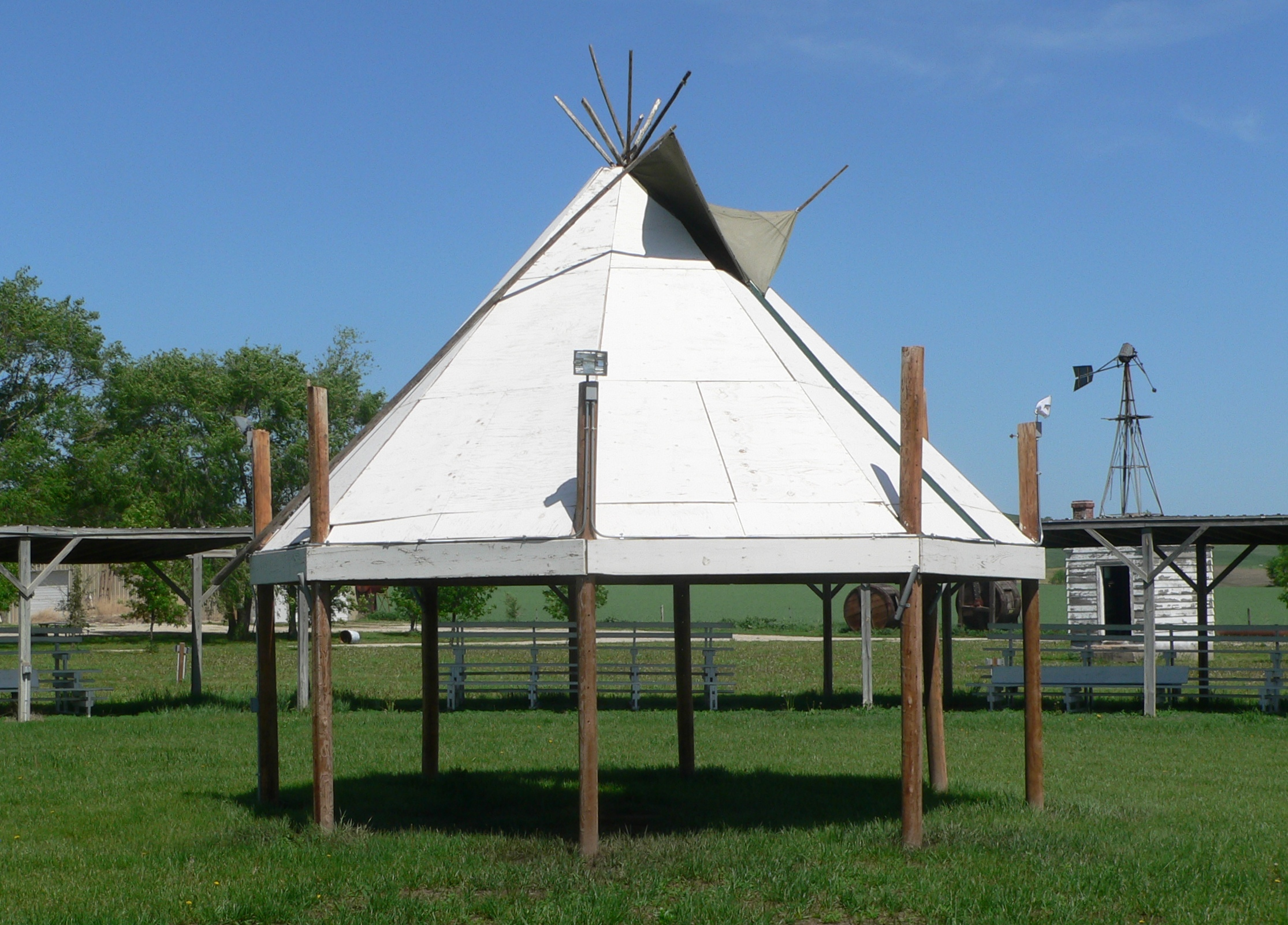
Pow Wow circle

A Pow Wow circle is in the district.
