= Pospeshil Theatre =

- Formerly listed on the U.S. National Register of Historic Places
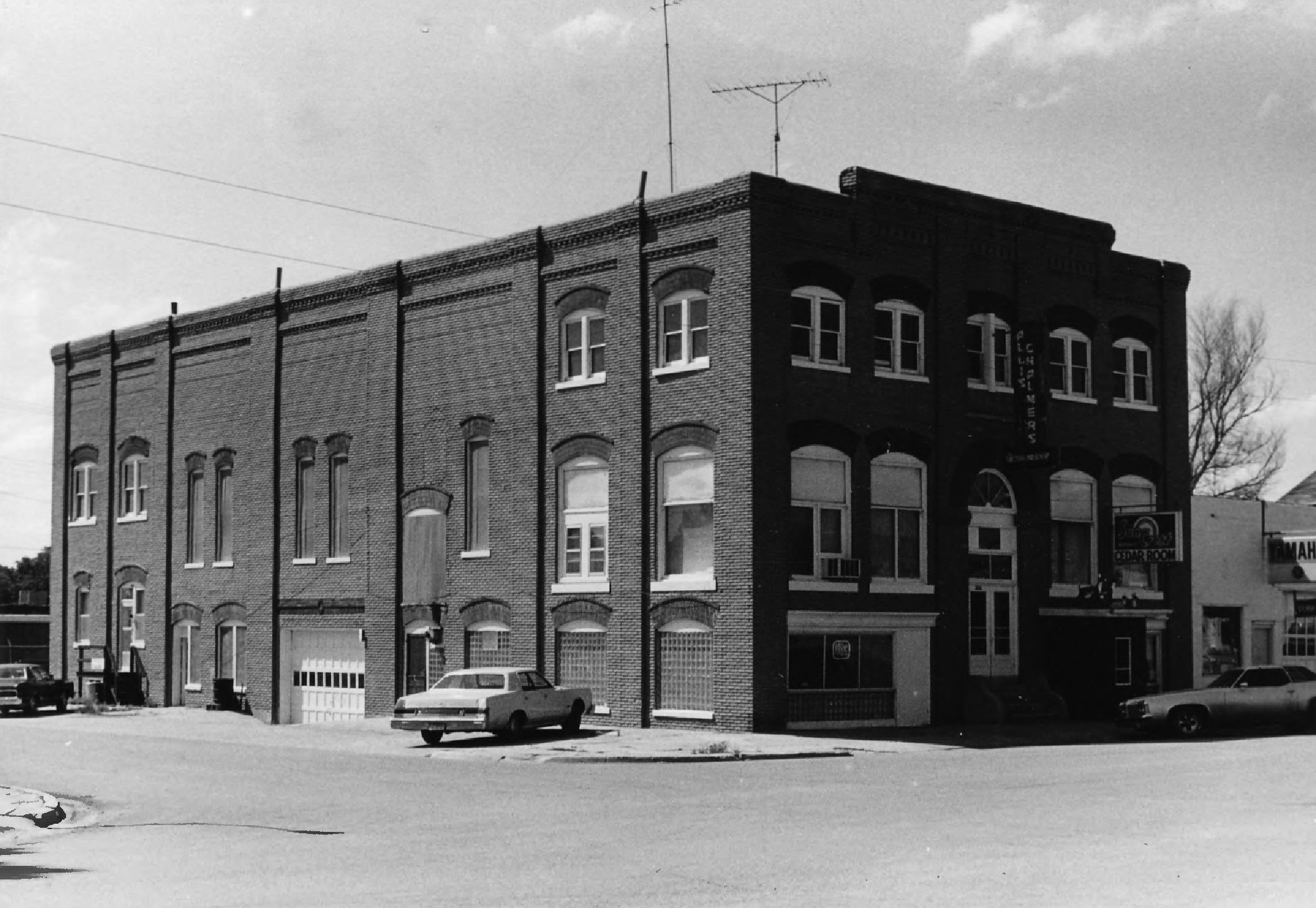
- The theater in 1987
- Location: 123 Broadway, Bloomfield, Nebraska
- Coordinates: 42.598056°N 97.645556°W
- Area: less than one acre
- Built: 1906
- Architectural style: Two-part commercial block
- MPS: Opera House Buildings in Nebraska 1867-1917 MPS
- NRHP reference No.: 88000935

Significant dates
- Added to NRHP: September 28, 1988
- Removed from NRHP: March 25, 2019

The Pospeshil Theatre in Bloomfield, Nebraska was built in 1906. It was listed on the National Register of Historic Places in 1988, and was delisted in 2019.

It was a two-part commercial block building that was located at the northwest corner of Grant St. and S. Broadway. The building was 114 by 50 feet (35 m × 15 m) in plan. It was "utilitarian in appearance" except for having "red brick arches over its windows and red brick ridges along the top of the building."

The building was deemed significant in the area of social history and performing arts history of Nebraska.

It was identified as one of 25 Nebraska historic opera house buildings worthy of intensive study in a 1988 review.

The building burned down; Bloomfield's public library was built in 2000 on the former site.
