= Winnetoon, Nebraska =

Village in Knox County, Nebraska, United States

- Village
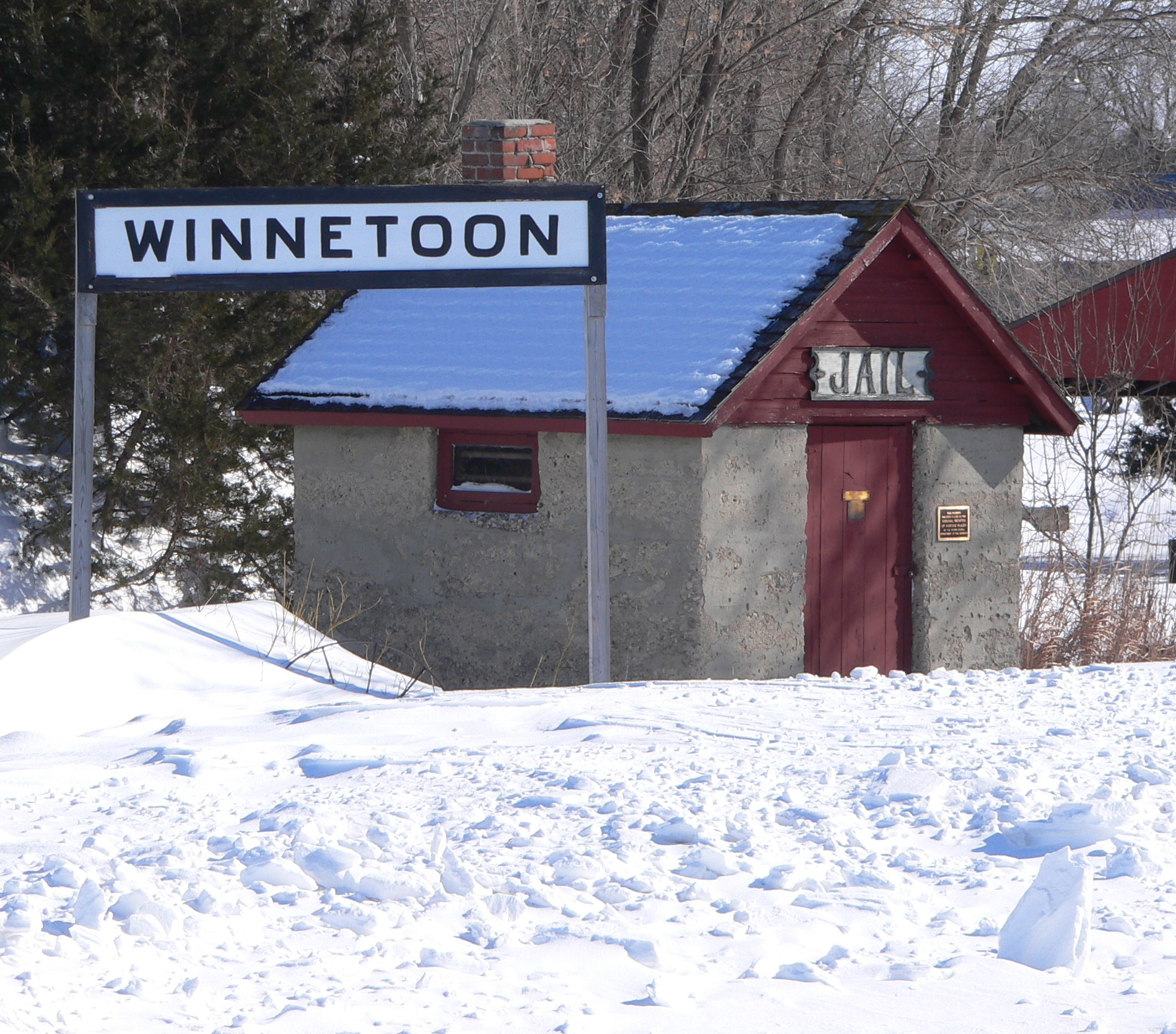
- Winnetoon's historic jail, built in 1907, is now part of a park at the northwestern edge of the village.

- Location of Winnetoon, Nebraska
- Coordinates: 42°30′49″N 97°57′36″W
- Country: United States
- State: Nebraska
- County: Knox

Area
  - Total: 0.29 sq mi (0.75 km^{2})
  - Land: 0.29 sq mi (0.75 km^{2})
  - Water: 0 sq mi (0.00 km^{2})
- Elevation: 1,654 ft (504 m)

Population (2020)
  - Total: 54
  - Density: 186.0/sq mi (71.83/km^{2})
- Time zone: UTC-6 (Central (CST))
  - Summer (DST): UTC-5 (CDT)
- ZIP code: 68789
- Area code: 402
- FIPS code: 31-53345
- GNIS feature ID: 2399719

Winnetoon is a village in Knox County, Nebraska, United States. As of the 2020 census, Winnetoon had a population of 54.

== History ==
Winnetoon was founded circa 1892 and was incorporated as a village in 1900. It was named after the Wisconsin farm of an acquaintance of a railroad official.

A post office has been in operation in Winnetoon since 1891.

== Geography ==
According to the United States Census Bureau, the village has a total area of 0.29 square miles (0.75 km^{2}), all land.

== Demographics ==
Historical population
Census	Pop.	Note	%±
1910	220		—
1920	208		−5.5%
1930	159		−23.6%
1940	141		−11.3%
1950	120		−14.9%
1960	85		−29.2%
1970	84		−1.2%
1980	82		−2.4%
1990	59		−28.0%
2000	70		18.6%
2010	68		−2.9%
2020	54		−20.6%
U.S. Decennial Census

=== 2010 census ===
As of the census of 2010, there were 68 people, 31 households, and 20 families living in the village. The population density was 234.5 inhabitants per square mile (90.5/km^{2}). There were 40 housing units at an average density of 137.9 per square mile (53.2/km^{2}). The racial makeup of the village was 95.6% White and 4.4% Native American.

There were 31 households, of which 16.1% had children under the age of 18 living with them, 58.1% were married couples living together, 3.2% had a female householder with no husband present, 3.2% had a male householder with no wife present, and 35.5% were non-families. 25.8% of all households were made up of individuals, and 6.5% had someone living alone who was 65 years of age or older. The average household size was 2.19 and the average family size was 2.70.

The median age in the village was 51.5 years. 17.6% of residents were under the age of 18; 4.4% were between the ages of 18 and 24; 16.1% were from 25 to 44; 48.5% were from 45 to 64; and 13.2% were 65 years of age or older. The gender makeup of the village was 54.4% male and 45.6% female.

=== 2000 census ===
As of the census of 2000, there were 70 people, 33 households, and 22 families living in the village. The population density was 243.6 inhabitants per square mile (94.1/km^{2}). There were 37 housing units at an average density of 128.8 per square mile (49.7/km^{2}). The racial makeup of the village was 100.00% White.

There were 33 households, out of which 21.2% had children under the age of 18 living with them, 48.5% were married couples living together, 18.2% had a female householder with no husband present, and 33.3% were non-families. 30.3% of all households were made up of individuals, and 21.2% had someone living alone who was 65 years of age or older. The average household size was 2.12 and the average family size was 2.64.

In the village, the population was spread out, with 20.0% under the age of 18, 1.4% from 18 to 24, 25.7% from 25 to 44, 30.0% from 45 to 64, and 22.9% who were 65 years of age or older. The median age was 46 years. For every 100 females, there were 100.0 males. For every 100 females age 18 and over, there were 93.1 males.

As of 2000 the median income for a household in the village was $19,000, and the median income for a family was $20,625. Males had a median income of $25,625 versus $22,083 for females. The per capita income for the village was $13,270. There were 18.2% of families and 15.2% of the population living below the poverty line, including 35.3% of under eighteens and none of those over 64.

== See also ==
- List of municipalities in Nebraska
