= Fort Randall Dam =

Dam in Gregory and Charles Mix Counties, South Dakota

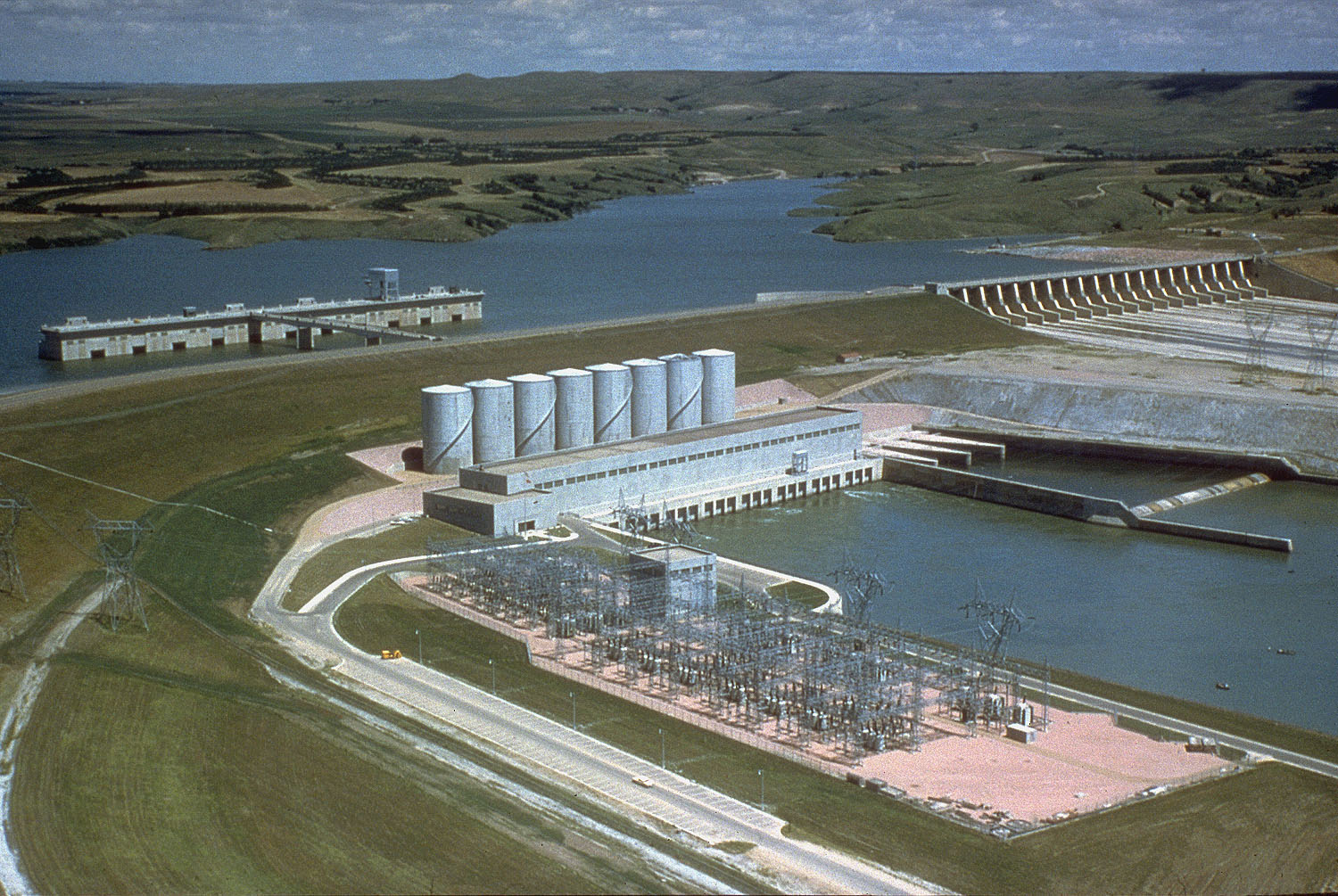
- Fort Randall Dam and Power Plant, with Lake Francis Case in the background

- Location of Fort Randall Dam in the State of South Dakota
- Country: United States
- Location: Gregory County and Charles Mix County, South Dakota
- Coordinates: 43.066722°N 98.553897°W
- Purpose: Flood control, hydroelectric power, irrigation, water supply, river navigation, and recreation
- Status: Operational
- Construction began: 1946; 80 years ago
- Opening date: 1953; 73 years ago
- Construction cost: $200 million
- Owners: U.S. Army Corps of Engineers, Omaha District

Dam and spillways
- Type of dam: Rolled-earth fill
- Impounds: Missouri River
- Height: 165 ft (50 m)
- Length: 10,700 ft (3,261 m) (including spillway)
- Spillways: 21 40-foot × 29-foot tainter gates

Reservoir
- Creates: Lake Francis Case
- Total capacity: 5.418 million acre⋅ft (7 billion m^{3})
- Catchment area: 14,150 mi^{2} (36,648 km^{2})
- Surface area: 102,000 acres (41,000 ha)
- Maximum length: 107 mi (172 km)
- Maximum water depth: 140 ft (43 m)
- Normal elevation: 1,350–1,375 feet msl

Power Station
- Operator: U.S. Army Corps of Engineers
- Website; U.S. Army Corps of Engineers - Fort Randall Project

Fort Randall Dam is a 2.03-mile-long (3 km) earthen dam which spans the Missouri River and impounds Lake Francis Case, the 11th-largest reservoir in the U.S. The dam joins Gregory and Charles Mix counties, South Dakota, a distance of 880 river miles (1,416 km) upstream of St. Louis, Missouri, where the river joins the Mississippi River. The dam and hydroelectric power plant were constructed by and are currently operated by the U.S. Army Corps of Engineers.

== History and background ==
Fort Randall Dam was authorized by the Flood Control Act of 1944 and plays a key role in the Pick–Sloan Plan for development of water resources in the Missouri River basin. The U.S. Army Corps of Engineers began construction of the dam in 1946, and was the first Pick–Sloan dam completed by the Omaha District. President Dwight D. Eisenhower threw the switch that started the first power generating unit in 1954. When completed in 1956, Fort Randall Dam and the Lake Francis Case Project cost approximately $200 million. U.S. Route 18 and U.S. Route 281 cross the crest of the dam. The dam is just over 3 mi (5 km) north of the Nebraska state line.

The Fort Randall Dam is located within sight of its namesake Fort Randall, an early U.S. Army Frontier Post. Fort Randall Dam is one of six Missouri River mainstem dams; the next dam upstream is Big Bend Dam, near Ft. Thompson, and the next dam downstream is Gavins Point Dam, near Yankton.

A significant birding site, the Fort Randall Eagle Roost, is located near the dam. The Eagle Roost was listed as a National Natural Landmark in 1967, shortly after completion of the dam. The eagles that roost here may use the dam's spillway to catch and eat fish.

== Hydroelectric Power ==
The eight generating units of the Fort Randall Dam are capable of generating 40 megawatts of electricity each, with an annual production of 1.727 billion kilowatt-hours. The combined maximum capacity of 320 megawatts is enough to supply 245,000 households, according to the Corps of Engineers. The river behind the dam drains an area of 263,480 mi^{2} (682,400 km^{2}). Its reservoir, Lake Francis Case, has a surface area of 102,000 acres (41,000 ha) at maximum operating pool, coinciding with a volume of 5.7 million acre⋅ft (7.0 billion m^{3}).

== 2011 Missouri River flood ==
In June 2011, in response to the 2011 Missouri River Floods, the dam was releasing over 143,000 cu ft/s (4,000 m^{3}/s), which greatly exceeded its previous record release of 67,000 cu ft/s (1,900 m^{3}/s) set in 1997.

== Visitor Center ==
The Fort Randall Visitor Center is located on the western edge of Pickstown, South Dakota, along U.S. Highway 281 and 18. Open from Memorial Day through Labor Day, the visitor center offers a view of the Dam, Lake Francis Case, and the Missouri River. Exhibits highlight the dam's construction, area, natural and cultural history, and paleontology. There is also a freshwater aquarium with fish species found in the Missouri River.

== See also ==
- Lake Francis Case
- Missouri National Recreational River
- Pick–Sloan Missouri Basin Program
- Pickstown, South Dakota
- List of crossings of the Missouri River
