= Pickstown, South Dakota =

- Town
- Location in Charles Mix County and the state of South Dakota
- Coordinates: 43°04′01″N 98°31′47″W
- Country: United States
- State: South Dakota
- County: Charles Mix

Area
  - Total: 0.61 sq mi (1.58 km^{2})
  - Land: 0.61 sq mi (1.58 km^{2})
  - Water: 0 sq mi (0.00 km^{2})
- Elevation: 1,483 ft (452 m)

Population (2020)
  - Total: 230
  - Density: 376.1/sq mi (145.23/km^{2})
- Time zone: UTC-6 (Central (CST))
  - Summer (DST): UTC-5 (CDT)
- ZIP code: 57367
- Area code: 605
- FIPS code: 46-49460
- GNIS feature ID: 1267531
- Website: www.pickstown-sd.net

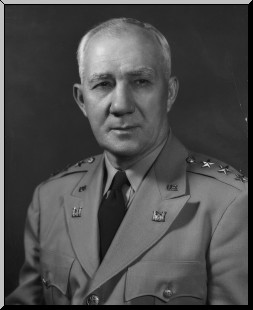
U.S. Army General Lewis A. Pick, namesake of Pickstown.

Pickstown is a town in southern Charles Mix County, South Dakota, United States. The population was 230 at the 2020 census. It was named after U.S. Army General Lewis A. Pick, former director of the Missouri River Office of the United States Army Corps of Engineers.

== History ==
Pickstown began as a government town for U.S. Army Corps of Engineers employees building and then operating nearby Fort Randall Dam. United States Air Force officers and airmen arrived in the 1950s to operate a Strategic Air Command radar base built on a hill three miles east of town, locally known as "Radar Hill". Air Force personnel left in the 1970s after the base closed. Currently, the "Fort Randall Casino and Hotel" owned and operated by the Yankton Sioux Tribe is located at the abandoned radar base.

The U.S. Army Corps of Engineers owned Pickstown until the town incorporated in 1985.

== High school ==
The high school athletic teams were nicknamed the Engineers. The high school closed in 1968. Students attend the Lake Andes high school.

== Geography ==
Pickstown is located adjacent to the east side of the Fort Randall Dam on the Missouri River. The town is served by U.S. Route 18, U.S. Route 281 and South Dakota Highway 46. According to the United States Census Bureau, the town has a total area of 0.65 square miles (1.68 km^{2}), all land. The Fort Randall Eagle Roost, a National Natural Landmark, is also nearby.

== Demographics ==
Historical population
| Census | Pop. | Note | %± |
|---|---|---|---|
| 1990 | 95 | | — |
| 2000 | 168 | | 76.8% |
| 2010 | 201 | | 19.6% |
| 2020 | 230 | | 14.4% |
U.S. Decennial Census

=== 2010 census ===
As of the census of 2010, there were 201 people, 93 households, and 62 families residing in the town. The population density was 309.2 inhabitants per square mile (119.4/km^{2}). There were 114 housing units at an average density of 175.4 per square mile (67.7/km^{2}). The racial makeup of the town was 82.6% White, 10.4% Native American, 0.5% Asian, and 6.5% from two or more races. Hispanic or Latino of any race were 1.0% of the population.

There were 93 households, of which 19.4% had children under the age of 18 living with them, 58.1% were married couples living together, 4.3% had a female householder with no husband present, 4.3% had a male householder with no wife present, and 33.3% were non-families. 28.0% of all households were made up of individuals, and 11.8% had someone living alone who was 65 years of age or older. The average household size was 2.16 and the average family size was 2.58.

The median age in the town was 51.2 years. 17.4% of residents were under the age of 18; 5.1% were between the ages of 18 and 24; 19% were from 25 to 44; 36.8% were from 45 to 64; and 21.9% were 65 years of age or older. The gender makeup of the town was 49.8% male and 50.2% female.

=== 2000 census ===
As of the census of 2000, there were 168 people, 76 households, and 49 families residing in the town. The population density was 260.7 inhabitants per square mile (100.7/km^{2}). There were 88 housing units at an average density of 136.5 per square mile (52.7/km^{2}). The racial makeup of the town was 85.12% White, 11.31% Native American, 0.60% Asian, and 2.98% from two or more races.

There were 76 households, out of which 22.4% had children under the age of 18 living with them, 57.9% were married couples living together, 2.6% had a female householder with no husband present, and 35.5% were non-families. 26.3% of all households were made up of individuals, and 6.6% had someone living alone who was 65 years of age or older. The average household size was 2.21 and the average family size was 2.69.

In the town, the population was spread out, with 19.6% under the age of 18, 3.6% from 18 to 24, 28.6% from 25 to 44, 28.0% from 45 to 64, and 20.2% who were 65 years of age or older. The median age was 44 years. For every 100 females, there were 124.0 males. For every 100 females age 18 and over, there were 121.3 males.

The median income for a household in the town was $50,250, and the median income for a family was $55,250. Males had a median income of $39,375 versus $19,792 for females. The per capita income for the town was $20,755. None of the families and 1.1% of the population were living below the poverty line, including no under eighteens and 6.3% of those over 64.

== Climate ==
This climatic region is typified by large seasonal temperature differences, with warm to hot (and often humid) summers and cold (sometimes severely cold) winters. According to the Köppen Climate Classification system, Pickstown has a humid continental climate, abbreviated "Dfa" on climate maps.

Climate data for Pickstown, South Dakota
| Month | Jan | Feb | Mar | Apr | May | Jun | Jul | Aug | Sep | Oct | Nov | Dec | Year |
|---|---|---|---|---|---|---|---|---|---|---|---|---|---|
| Mean daily maximum °C (°F) | −1 (31) | 2 (36) | 8 (46) | 16 (61) | 22 (72) | 28 (82) | 31 (88) | 31 (87) | 25 (77) | 18 (64) | 8 (47) | 2 (35) | 16 (60) |
| Mean daily minimum °C (°F) | −13 (9) | −10 (14) | −4 (24) | 2 (36) | 9 (48) | 14 (58) | 17 (63) | 17 (62) | 11 (52) | 4 (40) | −3 (26) | −9 (15) | 3 (37) |
| Average precipitation mm (inches) | 10 (0.4) | 15 (0.6) | 36 (1.4) | 66 (2.6) | 81 (3.2) | 94 (3.7) | 66 (2.6) | 64 (2.5) | 61 (2.4) | 43 (1.7) | 23 (0.9) | 15 (0.6) | 570 (22.5) |
Source: Weatherbase

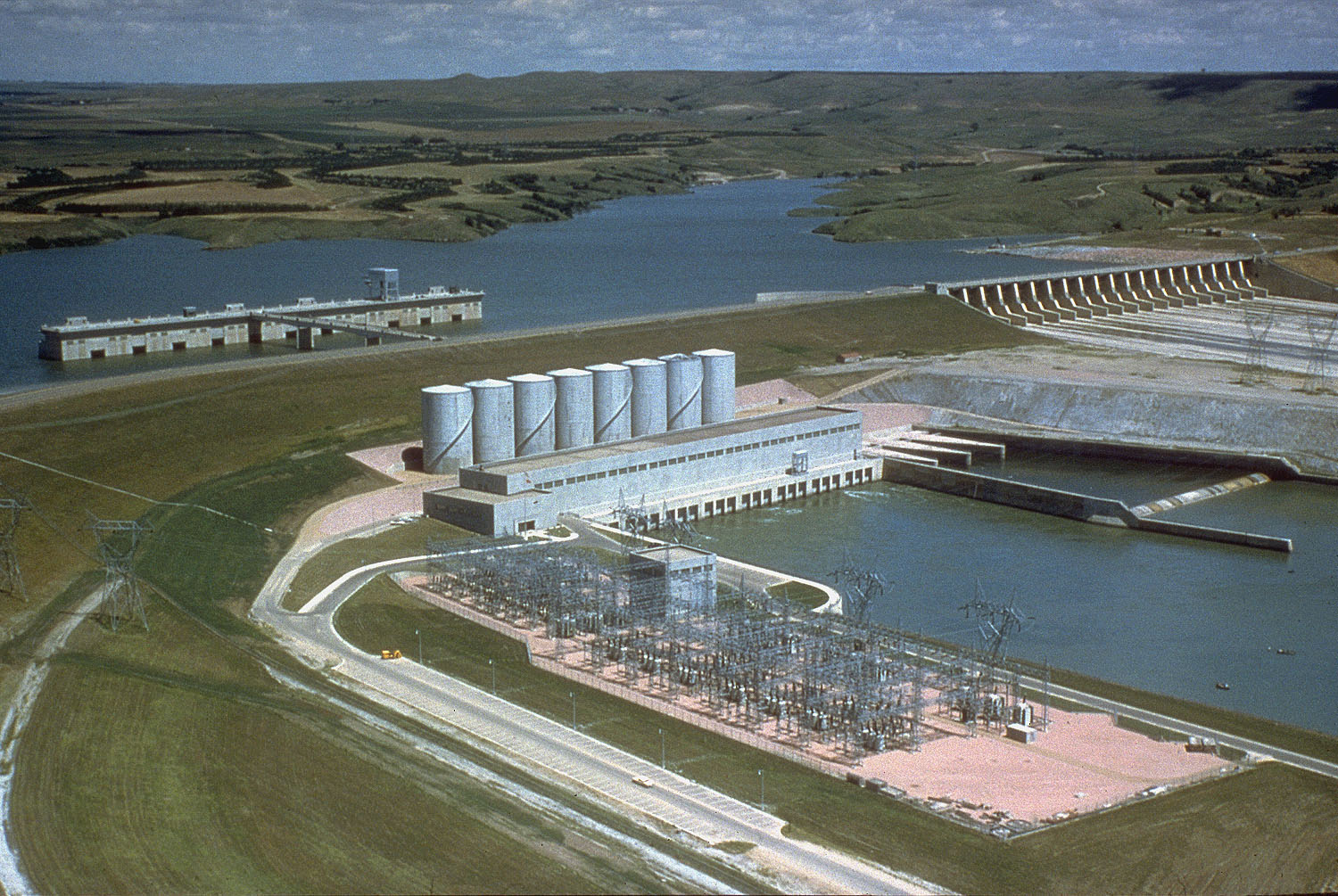
Fort Randall Dam: Pickstown began as a government town for U.S. Army Corps of Engineers employees building and then operating the nearby dam.

== Points of interest ==
- Lake Francis Case
- Fort Randall Dam
- Fort Randall Eagle Roost
- Fort Randall Military Post (1856–1892)

== Notable person ==
- Tom Brokaw, television journalist and author

== See also ==
- List of towns in South Dakota
