= Niobrara, Nebraska =

Village in Knox County, Nebraska, United States

Niobrara Ní Ubthátha (Omaha–Ponca)
- Village
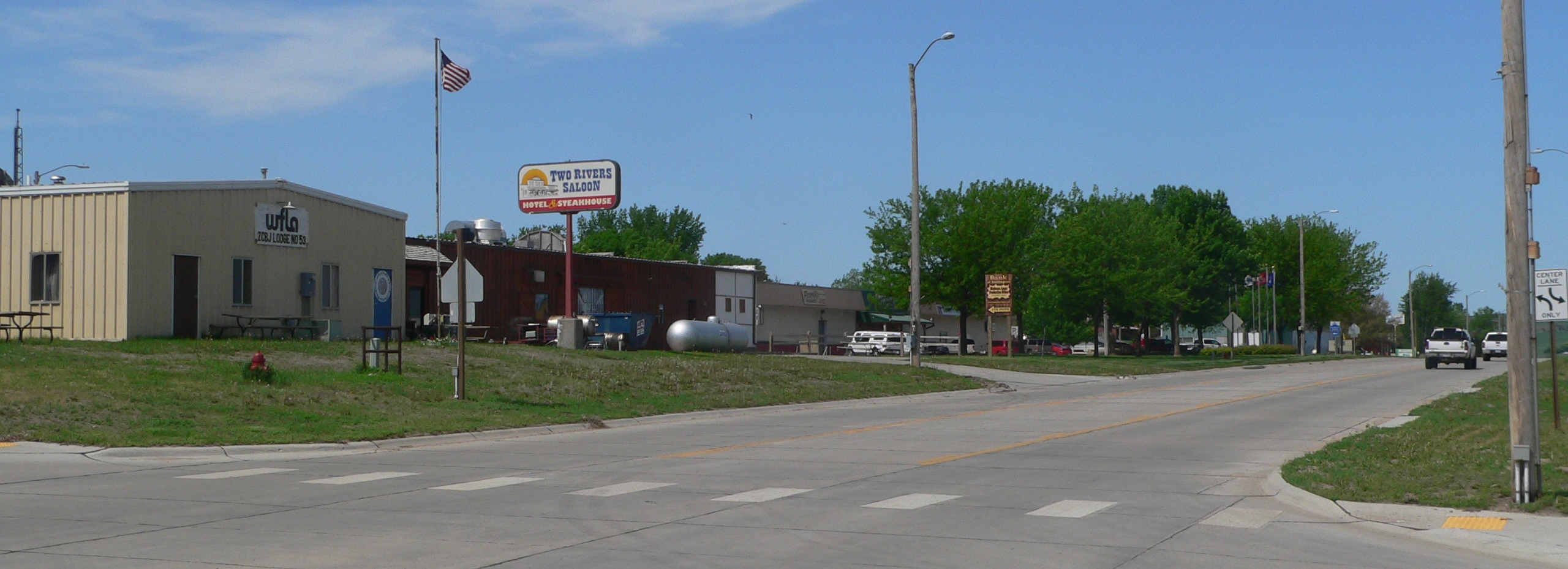
- Nebraska Highway 12 in Niobrara

- Location of Niobrara within Knox County, Nebraska
- Coordinates: 42°45′09″N 98°01′50″W
- Country: United States
- State: Nebraska
- County: Knox

Area
  - Total: 0.73 sq mi (1.89 km^{2})
  - Land: 0.73 sq mi (1.89 km^{2})
  - Water: 0 sq mi (0.00 km^{2})
- Elevation: 1,299 ft (396 m)

Population (2020)
  - Total: 365
  - Estimate (2021): 363
  - Density: 501.1/sq mi (193.49/km^{2})
- Time zone: UTC−6 (Central (CST))
  - Summer (DST): UTC−5 (CDT)
- ZIP Code: 68760
- Area code: 402
- FIPS code: 31-34370
- GNIS feature ID: 2399499
- Website: www.niobrarane.com

Niobrara (/ˌnaɪ.əˈbrærə/ NY-ə-BRARR-ə; Omaha: Ní Ubthátha [nĩꜜ ubɫᶞaꜜɫᶞa] or Tʰáⁿwaⁿgthaⁿ [tʰãꜜwãŋɡɫᶞã], meaning 'water spread-out') is a village in Knox County, Nebraska, United States. The population was 363 at the 2020 census.

== History ==
Niobrara was founded in 1856, when a group of men headed by a Dr. Benneville Yeakel Shelly marked their claim to an area on the banks of the Missouri River. There, a fort was built to protect the early settlers from Indian attacks. The settlement took its name from the Niobrara River.

The village has been moved twice. It was first moved after a winter flood destroyed parts of the original settlement in 1881. It was moved again after a ruling in 1976 by the US Court of Claims, in the case of Barnes v. United States. The court ruled that US Corps of Engineers was responsible for ground water related damage driven by sediment build up caused by the Gavins Point Dam.

== Geography ==
Nebraska highways 12 and 14 run through the village, Highway 14 connects Nebraska with South Dakota via the Chief Standing Bear Memorial Bridge, just east of the village across the Missouri River.

According to the United States Census Bureau, the village has a total area of 0.73 square miles (1.89 km^{2}), all land. The Niobrara River, which is right next to the town, actually courses through the Mormon Canal rather than its original riverbed.

== Demographics ==
Historical population
| Census | Pop. | Note | %± |
|---|---|---|---|
| 1880 | 475 | | — |
| 1890 | 633 | | 33.3% |
| 1900 | 459 | | −27.5% |
| 1910 | 633 | | 37.9% |
| 1920 | 736 | | 16.3% |
| 1930 | 761 | | 3.4% |
| 1940 | 629 | | −17.3% |
| 1950 | 577 | | −8.3% |
| 1960 | 736 | | 27.6% |
| 1970 | 602 | | −18.2% |
| 1980 | 419 | | −30.4% |
| 1990 | 376 | | −10.3% |
| 2000 | 379 | | 0.8% |
| 2010 | 370 | | −2.4% |
| 2020 | 365 | | −1.4% |
U.S. Decennial Census

=== 2010 census ===
At the 2010 census there were 370 people, 193 households, and 93 families in the village. The population density was 506.8 inhabitants per square mile (195.7/km^{2}). There were 251 housing units at an average density of 343.8 per square mile (132.7/km^{2}). The racial makeup of the village was 84.3% White, 0.3% African American, 11.6% Native American, and 3.8% from two or more races. Hispanic or Latino of any race were 2.4%.

Of the 193 households 15.0% had children under the age of 18 living with them, 37.3% were married couples living together, 7.3% had a female householder with no husband present, 3.6% had a male householder with no wife present, and 51.8% were non-families. 45.6% of households were one person and 23.3% were one person aged 65 or older. The average household size was 1.92 and the average family size was 2.70.

The median age in the village was 54.8 years. 16.8% of residents were under the age of 18; 4.5% were between the ages of 18 and 24; 17.1% were from 25 to 44; 32.4% were from 45 to 64; and 29.2% were 65 or older. The gender makeup of the village was 51.4% male and 48.6% female.

=== 2000 census ===
At the 2000 census there were 379 people, 184 households, and 107 families in the village. The population density was 525.2 inhabitants per square mile (202.8/km^{2}). There were 230 housing units at an average density of 318.7 per square mile (123.1/km^{2}). The racial makeup of the village was 86.54% White, 10.29% Native American, 0.53% Pacific Islander, 0.53% from other races, and 2.11% from two or more races. Hispanic or Latino of any race were 2.37%.

Of the 184 households 22.8% had children under the age of 18 living with them, 46.7% were married couples living together, 8.2% had a female householder with no husband present, and 41.8% were non-families. 39.7% of households were one person and 22.8% were one person aged 65 or older. The average household size was 2.06 and the average family size was 2.72.

The age distribution was 22.7% under the age of 18, 3.4% from 18 to 24, 17.9% from 25 to 44, 32.2% from 45 to 64, and 23.7% 65 or older. The median age was 49 years. For every 100 females, there were 103.8 males. For every 100 females age 18 and over, there were 98.0 males.

The median household income was $26,000, and the median family income was $36,250. Males had a median income of $26,042 versus $21,250 for females. The per capita income for the village was $15,299. About 9.3% of families and 13.8% of the population were below the poverty line, including 28.4% of those under age 18 and 7.4% of those age 65 or over.

== Climate ==
This climatic region is typified by large seasonal temperature differences, with warm to hot (and often humid) summers and cold (sometimes severely cold) winters. According to the Köppen Climate Classification system, Niobrara has a humid continental climate, abbreviated "Dfa" on climate maps.

Climate data for Niobrara, Nebraska
| Month | Jan | Feb | Mar | Apr | May | Jun | Jul | Aug | Sep | Oct | Nov | Dec | Year |
|---|---|---|---|---|---|---|---|---|---|---|---|---|---|
| Mean daily maximum °C (°F) | 0 (32) | 3 (37) | 8 (47) | 17 (63) | 23 (74) | 28 (83) | 32 (89) | 31 (87) | 26 (79) | 19 (67) | 9 (48) | 2 (36) | 17 (62) |
| Mean daily minimum °C (°F) | −13 (9) | −9 (15) | −4 (24) | 3 (37) | 9 (48) | 14 (58) | 17 (63) | 16 (61) | 11 (51) | 4 (39) | −4 (25) | −9 (15) | 3 (37) |
| Average precipitation mm (inches) | 13 (0.5) | 15 (0.6) | 36 (1.4) | 61 (2.4) | 86 (3.4) | 97 (3.8) | 74 (2.9) | 66 (2.6) | 58 (2.3) | 38 (1.5) | 23 (0.9) | 10 (0.4) | 580 (22.7) |
Source: Weatherbase

== Notable people ==
- Anton Krupicka, ultrarunner
- James Tufts, acting governor of Montana Territory

== See also ==
- List of municipalities in Nebraska
- Lewis and Clark Lake
- Niobrara State Park
- Niobrara Reservation
- Melbourne-Evans collision § Aftermath – memorial to the three Sage brothers
