= Central Township, Nebraska =

Central Township, Nebraska may refer to the following places in Nebraska:

- Central Township, Knox County, Nebraska
- Central Township, Merrick County, Nebraska

== See also ==
- Central Township (disambiguation)
