= Nebraska Highway 59 =

State highway in Nebraska, U.S.

State Highway 59

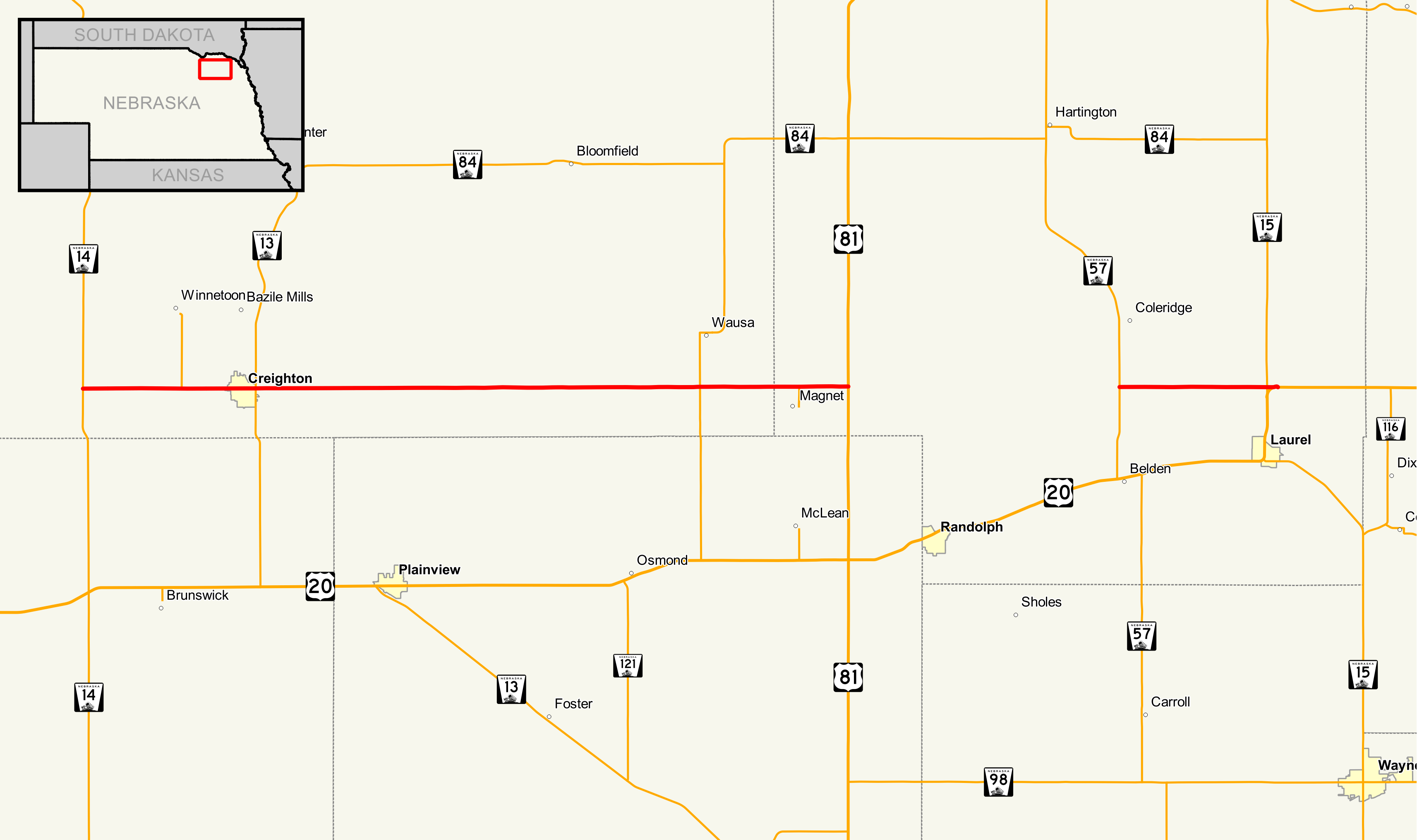
- Nebraska Highway 59 highlighted in red

Route information
- Maintained by NDOT
- Length: 37.49 mi (60.33 km)

Western segment
- Length: 31.06 mi (49.99 km)
- West end: N-14 west of Creighton
- East end: US 81 east of Magnet

Eastern segment
- Length: 6.43 mi (10.35 km)
- West end: N-57 south of Coleridge
- East end: US 20 / N-15 north of Laurel

Location
- Country: United States
- State: Nebraska
- Counties: Western segment: Knox, Cedar; Eastern segment: Cedar

Highway system
- Nebraska State Highway System; Interstate; US; State; Link; Spur; State Spurs; Recreation
← N-58	→ N-61

Nebraska Highway 59 is a highway in northeastern Nebraska. The highway is divided into two segments which combine for a length of 37.49 miles (60.33 km). The western segment of Nebraska Highway 59 has a western terminus at Nebraska Highway 14 west of Creighton and an eastern terminus at U.S. Highway 81 northeast of Magnet. The eastern segment of Highway 59 has its western terminus at Nebraska Highway 57 south of Coleridge and its eastern terminus at U.S. Highway 20 north of Laurel.

== Route description ==
=== Western segment ===
Nebraska Highway 59 begins at Nebraska Highway 14 west of Creighton. It continues east into farmland and through Creighton, then intersects Nebraska Highway 13. It continues due east and intersects Nebraska Highway 121 south of Wausa before ending northeast of Magnet at U.S. Highway 81.

=== Eastern segment ===
The eastern segment of Nebraska Highway 59 begins at Nebraska Highway 57 south of Coleridge and north of Belden. It goes straight east through farmland to the intersection of Nebraska Highway 15 and U.S. Highway 20 north of Laurel, where it ends.

== History ==
Prior to November 2001, the current eastern segment of Nebraska Highway 59 was an overlap of Nebraska Highway 15 and Nebraska Highway 57. That month, the two highways were swapped and the eastern segment of Nebraska Highway 59 was created.

== Major intersections ==
County	Location	mi	km	Destinations	Notes
Knox		0.00	0.00	N-14	Western terminus; road continues as 872nd Road
Knox		4.00	6.44	S-54B north (528 Avenue) – Winnetoon	
Knox	Creighton	7.02	11.30	N-13 – Center, Norfolk	
Knox		25.04	40.30	N-121 (549th Avenue)	
Cedar		29.06	46.77	S-14C south (553rd Avenue) – Magnet	
Cedar		31.06	49.99	US 81 – Yankton, Norfolk	Eastern terminus of western segment
Cedar	Gap in route; segments connected by 872nd Road				
Cedar		42.06	67.69	N-57 (566th Avenue) – Belden, Hartington	Western terminus of eastern segment
Cedar		48.04	77.31	N-15 (572 Avenue) to N-12 – Laurel, Wayne, Wynot	
Cedar		48.49	78.04	US 20 (872nd Road)	Eastern terminus
1.000 mi = 1.609 km; 1.000 km = 0.621 mi
