= Knoxville (disambiguation) =

Knoxville is a city in the U.S. state of Tennessee.

Knoxville may also refer to:

== Places ==
- Knoxville, Alabama
- Knoxville, Arkansas
- Knoxville, California
- Knoxville, Georgia, the county seat of Crawford County
- Knoxville, Illinois
- Knoxville, Iowa
- Knoxville, Missouri
- Knoxville, Maryland
- Knoxville, Nebraska
- Knoxville, Ohio
- Knoxville, Pennsylvania
- Knoxville (Pittsburgh), Pennsylvania
- Knoxville, West Virginia
- Knoxville metropolitan area, Tennessee

== Other uses ==
- Knoxville (video game), a cancelled video game by Press Play
- Knoxville College, a small, historically black college
- Johnny Knoxville (born 1971), American comic actor and stunt performer
- Knoxville Raceway, a United States Automobile Club Dirt Track
- Knoxville: Summer of 1915, a rhapsody for voice and orchestra composed by Samuel Barber
