= Verdigre =

Verdigre is the name of a city and a township in Knox County, Nebraska:

- Verdigre, Nebraska
- Verdigre Creek, a stream in Nebraska
- Verdigre Township, Knox County, Nebraska

== See also ==
- Verdigris - copper salt, common as a layer on copper that is exposed to the elements
