= Nebraska Highway 84 =

State highway in Nebraska, U.S.

State Highway 84

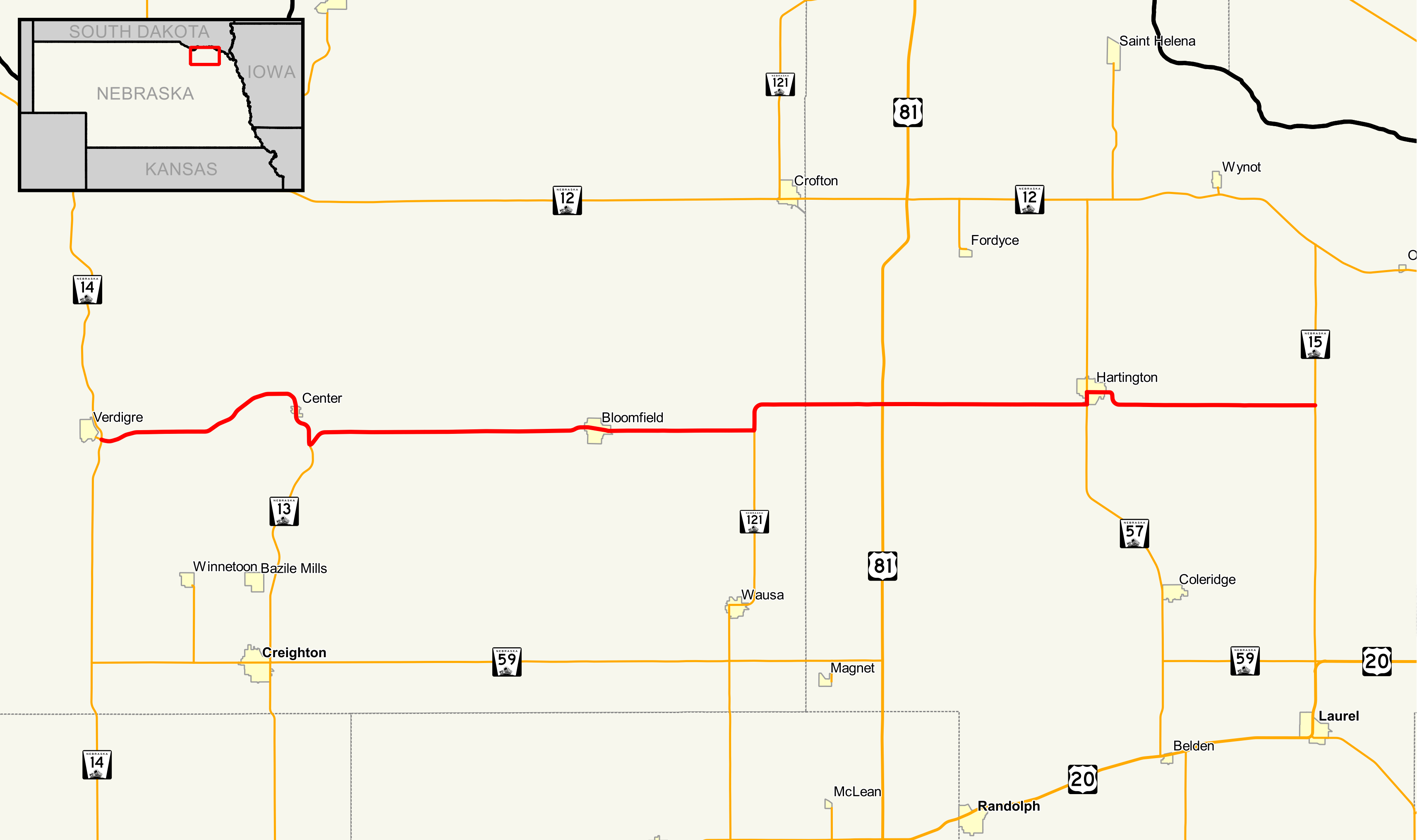
- Nebraska Highway 84 highlighted in red

Route information
- Maintained by NDOT
- Length: 51.57 mi (82.99 km)
- Existed: 1935–present

Major junctions
- West end: N-14 in Verdigre
- N-121 east of Bloomfield; US 81 west of Hartington
- East end: N-15 east of Hartington

Location
- Country: United States
- State: Nebraska
- Counties: Knox, Cedar

Highway system
- Nebraska State Highway System; Interstate; US; State; Link; Spur; State Spurs; Recreation
← US 83	→ N-85

Nebraska Highway 84 is a highway in the northeastern part of the U.S. state of Nebraska. Its western terminus is at Nebraska Highway 14 in Verdigre. Its eastern terminus is at an intersection with Nebraska Highway 15 east of Hartington.

== Route description ==
Nebraska Highway 84 begins at an intersection with NE 14 on the east side of Verdigre. It leaves Verdigre heading in a northeasterly direction into hilly prairieland before turning southward toward Center. It meets NE 13 south of Center and then heads eastward through farmland into Bloomfield. Further east, it meets NE 121 and runs concurrently northward for about a mile before splitting off to the east. The highway crosses US 81 and continues into Hartington at an intersection with Nebraska Highway 57. It heads north for a few blocks, running concurrently with NE 57 for about half a mile, before continuing to the east. After leaving Hartington, it continues eastward before terminating at an intersection with Nebraska Highway 15.

== Major intersections ==
County	Location	mi	km	Destinations	Notes
Knox	Verdigre	0.00	0.00	S-54A west / N-14	Western terminus; highway continues as S-54A
Knox	Center	10.24	16.48	N-13 south – Creighton	
Knox		27.93	44.95	N-121 south	
Cedar		33.83	54.44	US 81	
Cedar	Hartington	41.84	67.33	N-57 south – Wayne	West end of NE 57 overlap
Cedar	Hartington	42.32	68.11	N-57 north (Robinson Avenue north)	East end of NE 57 overlap
Cedar		51.57	82.99	N-15 (572 Avenue)	Eastern terminus; road continues unpaved as 882nd Road
1.000 mi = 1.609 km; 1.000 km = 0.621 mi: Concurrency terminus; Route transition

== See also ==
- List of state highways in Nebraska
