= Two Mile Prairie =

- Unincorporated community
- Location within the state of Missouri
- Coordinates: 39°1′5″N 92°10′1″W
- Country: United States
- State: Missouri
- County: Boone
- Township: Columbia
- Elevation: 879 ft (268 m)
- Time zone: UTC-6 (Central (CST))
  - Summer (DST): UTC-5 (CDT)
- GNIS feature ID: 759385

Two Mile Prairie is an area in northern Columbia Township, Boone County, Missouri, United States, northeast of Columbia. Its elevation is 879 feet (268 m). It shares a name with Two Mile Prairie Elementary School in Columbia. The community is part of the Columbia Metropolitan Statistical Area. It was named for its location on a two-mile wide prairie. It was described as "opulent" in 1908.
