= Ponca Fort =

Archaeological site in Missouri, USA

Coordinates: 42.8081°N 98.1636°W

Nanza is the Ponca name for what is now called Ponca Fort. It was a fortified village built by the Ponca in the vicinity of present-day Niobrara, Nebraska, United States, in circa 1700 and occupied until about 1865.

== Site location and information ==
The site of Nanza is located at the fork where Ponca Creek meets the Niobrara River, west of the Niobrara River's entry into the Missouri River. It is located in what is now Knox County, Nebraska, near the town of Verdel.

Nanza was a principal settlement for the Ponca and was built to protect the Ponca against the Arikaras, Cheyennes or Apaches. It contained earth lodges and was surrounded by several cemeteries, probably created during disease outbreaks after European contact. Today Ponca Fort lies on private property. The site is renowned among archaeologists for its resemblance to Middle Mississippian fortified towns found in Ohio which date from 800 through 1550.

Nanza comprises numerous earth lodge sites encircled by a protective wall about six feet high. Today the fortification is still visible. Archeological excavations have determined there was originally a ditch three feet deep and ten feet wide surrounding the berm. An earth embankment supporting a post palisade was discovered inside the ditch. Guns, hatchets, knives, beads, kettles, cloth and other European goods have been recovered from Ponca Fort, and serve as a testimony to the village's important position in the local fur trade. There is also evidence of extensive trade with other tribes. Pottery, stone mauls, mealing slabs and maulers, bone knives, hoes, tubes, shaft wrenches and picks, and strip bark in rolls from as far away as the Southeastern United States.

On April 3, 1973, the Ponca Fort was added to the National Register of Historic Places.

== See also ==
- Fort Lisa
- Cabanne's Trading Post
