= Herrick Township =

Herrick Township may refer to:

- Herrick Township, Shelby County, Illinois
- Herrick Township, Knox County, Nebraska
- Herrick Township, Bradford County, Pennsylvania
- Herrick Township, Susquehanna County, Pennsylvania
- Herrick Township, Deuel County, South Dakota, in Deuel County, South Dakota
