= Central Township =

Central Township may refer to:

- Central Township, Illinois
- Central Township, Jefferson County, Missouri
- Central Township, Knox County, Nebraska
- Central Township, Merrick County, Nebraska
