= Nebraska Highway 121 =

State highway in Nebraska, U.S.

State Highway 121

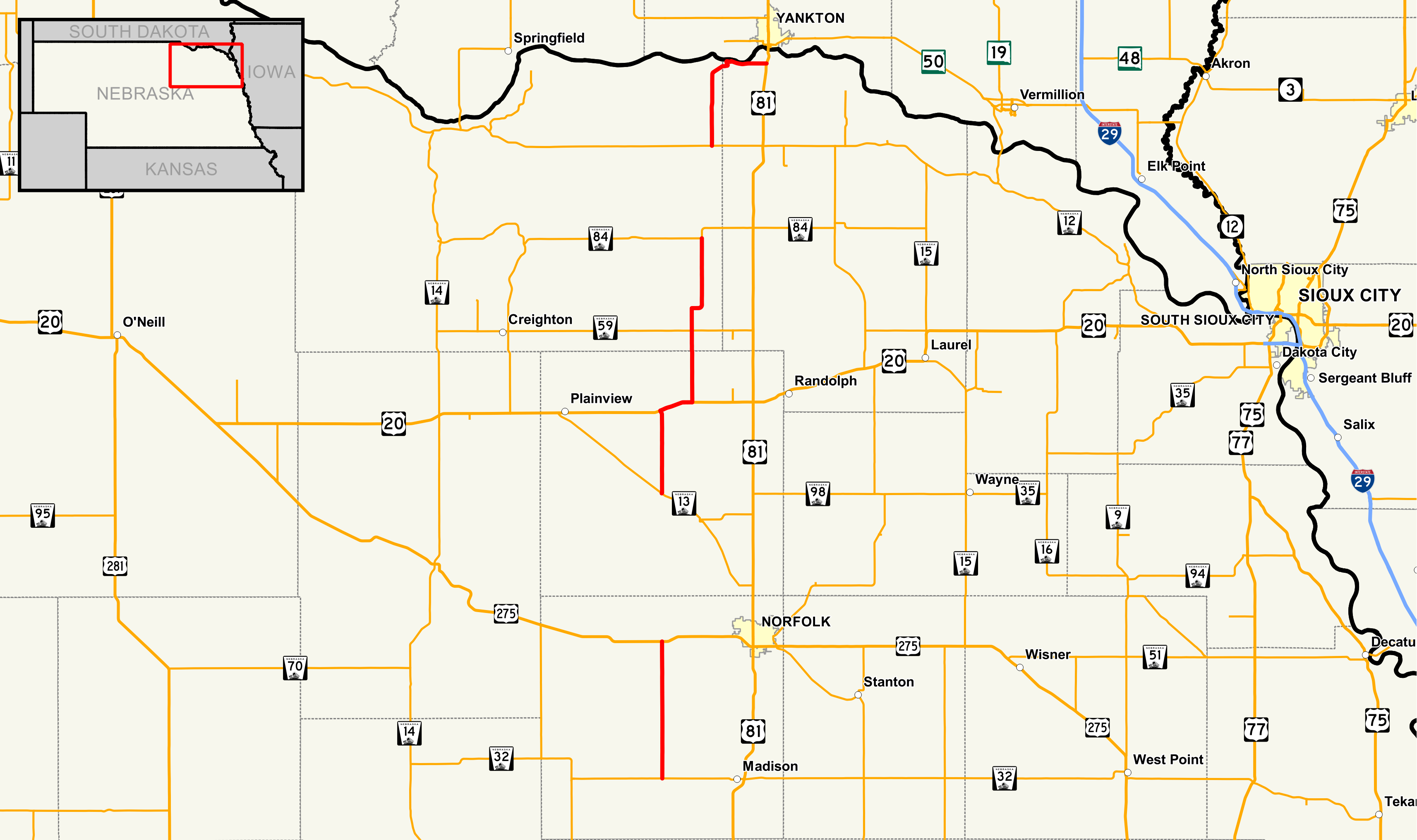
- Nebraska Highway 121 highlighted in red

Route information
- Maintained by NDOT
- Length: 55.03 mi (88.56 km)

Southern segment
- Length: 13.51 mi (21.74 km)
- South end: N-32 west of Madison
- North end: US 275 north of Battle Creek

Middle segment
- Length: 28.33 mi (45.59 km)
- South end: N-13 northwest of Pierce
- Major intersections: US 20 in Osmond
- North end: N-84 east of Bloomfield

Northern segment
- Length: 13.19 mi (21.23 km)
- South end: N-12 west of Crofton
- North end: US 81 northeast of Crofton

Location
- Country: United States
- State: Nebraska
- Counties: Southern segment: Madison; Middle segment: Pierce, Knox; Northern segment: Knox, Cedar

Highway system
- Nebraska State Highway System; Interstate; US; State; Link; Spur; State Spurs; Recreation
← N-116	→ N-128

Nebraska Highway 121 is a highway in northeastern Nebraska. It is a discontinuous highway with three segments:

- The southern segment begins at Nebraska Highway 32 west of Madison and ends at U.S. Highway 275 north of Battle Creek.
- The middle segment begins at Nebraska Highway 13 northwest of Pierce and ends at Nebraska Highway 84 north of Wausa.
- The northern segment begins at Nebraska Highway 12 in Crofton and ends at U.S. Highway 81 northeast of Crofton, near the South Dakota border.

== Route description ==
=== Southern segment ===
The southern segment of Nebraska Highway 121 begins at an intersection with NE 32 west of Madison. It heads in a northward direction through farmland, passing through Battle Creek. Just north of Battle Creek, it intersects with US 275, where this segment terminates for about 15 miles (24 km).

=== Middle segment ===
The middle segment of Nebraska Highway 121 begins at NE 13 northwest of Pierce. It heads in a northward direction through farmland, where it intersects with US 20 in Osmond. NE 121 runs concurrently with US 20 for about 3.5 miles (5.6 km) to the east, before splitting and continuing northward. It then intersects NE 59 before entering Wausa to the north. The highway turns to the east and then northward again as it passes through Wausa. Further north, it will meet NE 84 and the segment will terminate at that point, resuming about 10 miles (16 km) to the northeast.

=== Northern segment ===
The third segment of Nebraska Highway 121 begins at NE 12 in Crofton. It heads northward from Crofton through farmland, passing by the Lewis and Clark State Recreation Area and Gavins Point Dam. At that point, the highway turns to the northeast and finally directly eastward. It meets with US 81 south of the South Dakota border and just a couple of miles south of Yankton. NE 121 terminates at US 81.

== Major intersections ==
County	Location	mi	km	Destinations	Notes
Madison		0.00	0.00	N-32	Southern end of southern segment
Madison	Battle Creek	13.51	21.74	US 275 (Front Street)	Northern end of southern segment
Gap in route
Pierce		28.13	45.27	N-13	Southern end of middle segment
Pierce	Osmond	36.29	58.40	US 20 west (854th Road)	South end of US 20 overlap
Pierce	Osmond	39.58	63.70	US 20 east	North end of US 20 overlap
Knox		46.61	75.01	N-59	
Knox	Bloomfield	56.46	90.86	N-84	Northern end of middle segment
Knox	Gap in route				
Knox	Crofton	66.46	106.96	N-12 (Harold Street)	Southern end of northern segment
Cedar		79.65	128.18	US 81	Northern end of northern segment
1.000 mi = 1.609 km; 1.000 km = 0.621 mi: Concurrency terminus
