= Columbia Township =

Columbia Township may refer to the following places in the United States:

== Arkansas ==
- Columbia Township, Randolph County, Arkansas

== Indiana ==
- Columbia Township, Dubois County, Indiana
- Columbia Township, Fayette County, Indiana
- Columbia Township, Gibson County, Indiana
- Columbia Township, Jennings County, Indiana
- Columbia Township, Whitley County, Indiana

== Iowa ==
- Columbia Township, Tama County, Iowa
- Columbia Township, Wapello County, Iowa

== Kansas ==
- Columbia Township, Ellsworth County, Kansas

== Michigan ==
- Columbia Township, Jackson County, Michigan
- Columbia Township, Tuscola County, Michigan
- Columbia Township, Van Buren County, Michigan

== Minnesota ==
- Columbia Township, Minnesota

== Missouri ==
- Columbia Township, Boone County, Missouri

== Nebraska ==
- Columbia Township, Knox County, Nebraska

== New Jersey ==
- Columbia Township, New Jersey (historical)

== North Carolina ==
- Columbia Township, Pender County, North Carolina, in Pender County, North Carolina
- Columbia Township, Randolph County, North Carolina, in Randolph County, North Carolina
- Columbia Township, Tyrrell County, North Carolina, in Tyrrell County, North Carolina

== North Dakota ==
- Columbia Township, Eddy County, North Dakota

== Ohio ==
- Columbia Township, Hamilton County, Ohio
- Columbia Township, Lorain County, Ohio
- Columbia Township, Meigs County, Ohio

== Pennsylvania ==
- Columbia Township, Pennsylvania

== South Dakota ==
- Columbia Township, Brown County, South Dakota
