= Eastern Township =

Eastern Township may refer to one of the following townships in the United States:

- Eastern Township, Franklin County, Illinois
- Eastern Township, Otter Tail County, Minnesota
- Eastern Township, Knox County, Nebraska

== See also ==
- Eastern Townships, a tourist region and former administrative division of Quebec, Canada
