= Raymond Township, Knox County, Nebraska =

Raymond Township
- Township
- Location in Knox County
- Coordinates: 42°47′04″N 098°11′01″W
- Country: United States
- State: Nebraska
- County: Knox

Area
  - Total: 106.30 sq mi (275.32 km^{2})
  - Land: 100.26 sq mi (259.68 km^{2})
  - Water: 6.03 sq mi (15.63 km^{2}) 5.68%
- Elevation: 1,496 ft (456 m)

Population (2020)
  - Total: 183
  - Density: 1.83/sq mi (0.705/km^{2})
- GNIS feature ID: 0838205

Raymond Township is one of thirty townships in Knox County, Nebraska, United States. The population was 183 at the 2020 census. A 2023 estimate placed the township's population at 185.

The Village of Verdel lies within the Township.

== See also ==
- County government in Nebraska
