= Columbia Township, Indiana =

Columbia Township is the name of five townships in the U.S. state of Indiana:

- Columbia Township, Dubois County, Indiana
- Columbia Township, Fayette County, Indiana
- Columbia Township, Gibson County, Indiana
- Columbia Township, Jennings County, Indiana
- Columbia Township, Whitley County, Indiana

== See also ==
- Columbia Township (disambiguation)
