= Niobrara =

Niobrara may refer to:

- Niobrara, Nebraska
- Niobrara County, Wyoming
- Niobrara River
- Niobrara National Scenic River
- Niobrara Formation, a geological unit
- Niobrara Township, Knox County, Nebraska
- Niobraran Sea, alternative name for the Western Interior Seaway, prehistoric inland sea in central North America
