= Western Township =

Western Township may refer to one of the following places in the United States:

- Western Township, Henry County, Illinois
- Western Township, Logan County, Kansas
- Western Township, Otter Tail County, Minnesota
- Western Township, Knox County, Nebraska
- Western Township, Wells County, North Dakota

See also

- West Township (disambiguation)
