= Dukeville =

Dukeville may refer to:

- Dukeville, Nebraska, an unincorporated community in Knox County
- Dukeville, North Carolina, a populated place in Rowan County
