= Creighton Township, Knox County, Nebraska =

Creighton Township
- Township
- Location in Knox County
- Coordinates: 42°28′45″N 097°54′05″W
- Country: United States
- State: Nebraska
- County: Knox

Area
  - Total: 34.87 sq mi (90.32 km^{2})
  - Land: 34.87 sq mi (90.31 km^{2})
  - Water: 0.0039 sq mi (0.01 km^{2}) 0.01%
- Elevation: 1,621 ft (494 m)

Population (2020)
  - Total: 202
  - Density: 5.79/sq mi (2.24/km^{2})
- GNIS feature ID: 0837948

Creighton Township is one of thirty townships in Knox County, Nebraska, United States. The population was 202 at the 2020 census. A 2023 estimate placed the township's population at 200.

The Village of Bazile Mills lies within the Township.

== See also ==
- County government in Nebraska
