= Bloomfield Municipal Airport (Nebraska) =

Airport in Nebraska, United States

- IATA: none; ICAO: none; FAA LID: 84Y

Summary
- Airport type: Public
- Owner: Bloomfield Airport Authority
- Serves: Bloomfield, Nebraska
- Elevation AMSL: 1,673 ft (510 m)
- Coordinates: 42°34′47″N 097°40′25″W
- Interactive map of Bloomfield Municipal Airport

Runways
Direction	Length		Surface
Direction	ft	m	Surface
14/32	2,700	823	Asphalt

Statistics (2010)
- Aircraft operations: 4,050
- Based aircraft: 5
- Source: Federal Aviation Administration

Bloomfield Municipal Airport (FAA LID: 84Y) is a public use airport located two nautical miles (2.3 mi; 3.7 km) southwest of the central business district of Bloomfield, a city in Knox County, Nebraska, United States. It is owned by the Bloomfield Airport Authority.

== Facilities and aircraft ==
Bloomfield Municipal Airport covers an area of 94 acres (38 ha) at an elevation of 1,673 feet (510 m) above mean sea level. It has one runway designated 14/32 with an asphalt surface measuring 2,700 by 50 feet (823 by 15 m).

For the 12-month period ending August 4, 2010, the airport had 4,050 general aviation aircraft operations, an average of 11 per day. At that time there were five single-engine aircraft based at this airport.

== See also ==
- List of airports in Nebraska
