= Nebraska Highway 13 =

State highway in Nebraska, U.S.

State Highway 13

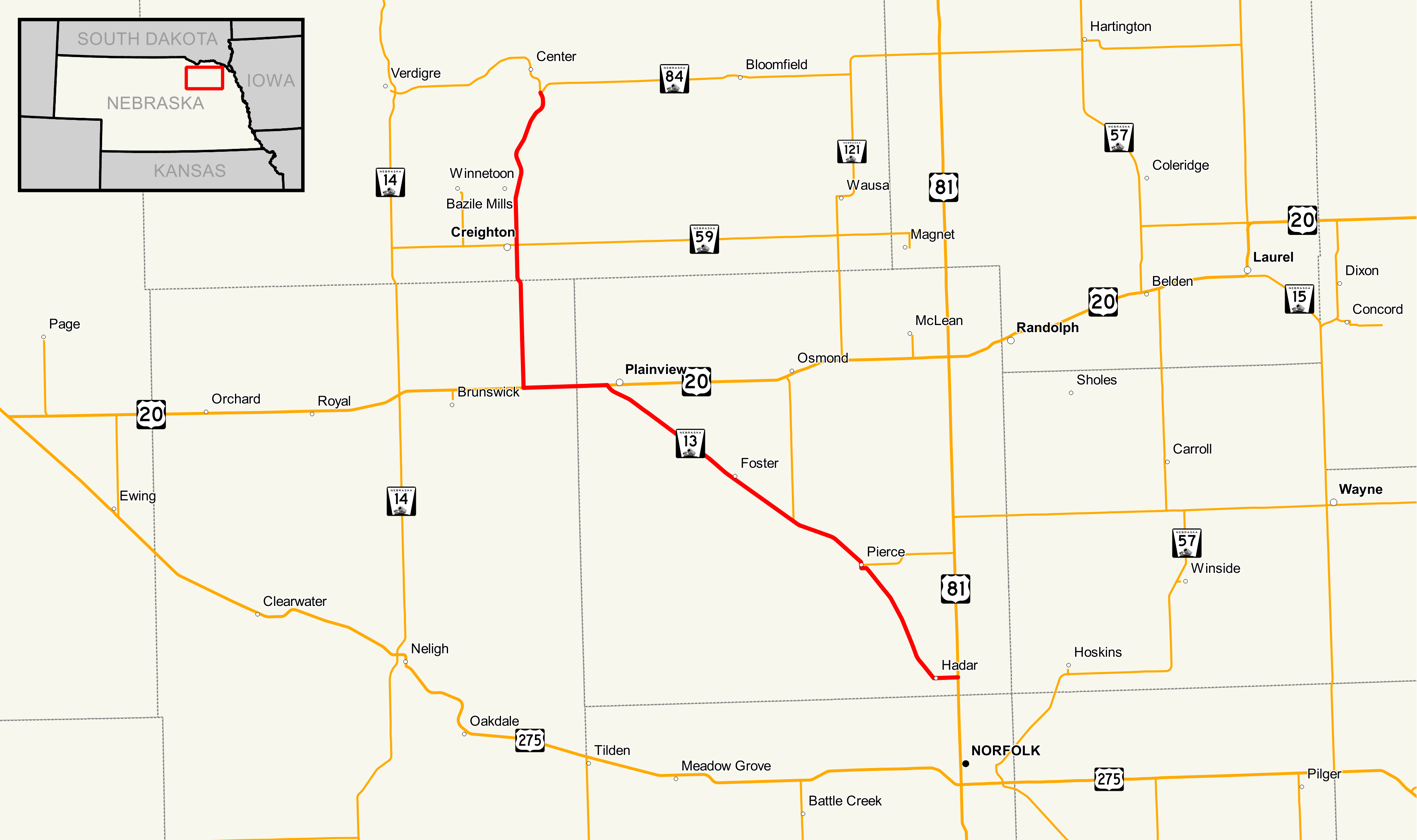
- Nebraska Highway 13 highlighted in red

Route information
- Maintained by NDOT
- Length: 48.54 mi (78.12 km)

Major junctions
- South end: US 81 east of Hadar
- US 20 in Plainview
- North end: N-84 south of Center

Location
- Country: United States
- State: Nebraska
- Counties: Pierce, Antelope, Knox

Highway system
- Nebraska State Highway System; Interstate; US; State; Link; Spur; State Spurs; Recreation
← N-12	→ N-14

Nebraska Highway 13 is a highway in the northeastern part of the U.S. state of Nebraska that runs predominantly northwest–southeast with a south terminus east of Hadar at an intersection with U.S. Highway 81 and a north terminus two miles (3 km) south of Center, Nebraska at an intersection with Nebraska Highway 84.

== Route description ==
Nebraska Highway 13 begins at U.S. Highway 81 north of Norfolk. It goes west through farmland into Hadar, then turns northwest through Pierce and Foster. At Plainview, NE 13 meets U.S. Highway 20 and the two highways overlap going west from Plainview. After 5 miles (8.0 km), NE 13 turns northward and meets Nebraska Highway 59 at Creighton. It continues northward and ends south of Center at an intersection with Nebraska Highway 84.

== Major intersections ==
County	Location	mi	km	Destinations	Notes
Pierce	Hadar	0.00	0.00	US 81 (555th Avenue)	
Pierce	Pierce	9.15	14.73	N-98 east (West Main Street)	
Pierce		13.85	22.29	N-121 north (546th Avenue)	
Pierce	Plainview	26.70	42.97	US 20 east (West Park Avenue)	South end of US 20 overlap
Antelope		31.38	50.50	US 20 west	North end of US 20 overlap
Knox	Creighton	39.46	63.50	N-59 (Main Street)	
Knox	Center	48.54	78.12	N-84	
1.000 mi = 1.609 km; 1.000 km = 0.621 mi: Concurrency terminus
