= Dolphin Township, Knox County, Nebraska =

Dolphin Township
- Township
- Location in Knox County
- Coordinates: 42°39′30″N 097°32′21″W
- Country: United States
- State: Nebraska
- County: Knox

Area
  - Total: 36.14 sq mi (93.59 km^{2})
  - Land: 36.14 sq mi (93.59 km^{2})
  - Water: 0 sq mi (0 km^{2}) 0%
- Elevation: 1,634 ft (498 m)

Population (2020)
  - Total: 130
  - Density: 3.6/sq mi (1.4/km^{2})
- GNIS feature ID: 0837965

Dolphin Township is a township (one of 30) in Knox County, Nebraska, United States. The population was 130 at the 2020 census. A 2023 estimate placed the township's population at 130.

== See also ==
- County government in Nebraska
