= Jefferson Township, Knox County, Nebraska =

Jefferson Township
- Township
- Location in Knox County
- Coordinates: 42°34′02″N 098°07′55″W
- Country: United States
- State: Nebraska
- County: Knox

Area
  - Total: 35.86 sq mi (92.88 km^{2})
  - Land: 35.64 sq mi (92.32 km^{2})
  - Water: 0.22 sq mi (0.56 km^{2}) 0.6%
- Elevation: 1,601 ft (488 m)

Population (2020)
  - Total: 108
  - Density: 3.03/sq mi (1.17/km^{2})
- GNIS feature ID: 0838072

Jefferson Township is one of thirty townships in Knox County, Nebraska, United States. The population was 108 at the 2020 census. A 2023 estimate placed the township's population at 108.

== See also ==
- County government in Nebraska
