= Frankfort Township, Knox County, Nebraska =

Frankfort Township
- Township
- Location in Knox County
- Coordinates: 42°48′38″N 097°32′22″W
- Country: United States
- State: Nebraska
- County: Knox

Area
  - Total: 18.10 sq mi (46.87 km^{2})
  - Land: 18.10 sq mi (46.87 km^{2})
  - Water: 0 sq mi (0 km^{2}) 0%
- Elevation: 1,463 ft (446 m)

Population (2020)
  - Total: 89
  - Density: 4.9/sq mi (1.9/km^{2})
- ZIP code: 68730
- Area codes: 402 and 531
- GNIS feature ID: 0838006

Frankfort Township is one of thirty townships in Knox County, Nebraska, United States. The population was 89 at the 2020 census. A 2023 estimate placed the township's population at 90.
