= Lincoln Township, Knox County, Nebraska =

Lincoln Township
- Township
- Location in Knox County
- Coordinates: 42°28′53″N 097°32′30″W
- Country: United States
- State: Nebraska
- County: Knox

Area
  - Total: 36.1 sq mi (93.4 km^{2})
  - Land: 36.1 sq mi (93.4 km^{2})
  - Water: 0 sq mi (0 km^{2}) 0%
- Elevation: 1,722 ft (525 m)

Population (2020)
  - Total: 741
  - Density: 20.5/sq mi (7.93/km^{2})
- GNIS feature ID: 0838096

Lincoln Township is one of thirty townships in Knox County, Nebraska, United States. The population was 741 at the 2020 census. A 2023 estimate placed the township's population at 729.

The Village of Wausa lies within the Township.

== See also ==
- County government in Nebraska
