= Sparta Township, Knox County, Nebraska =

Sparta Township
- Township
- Location in Knox County
- Coordinates: 42°38′56″N 098°00′42″W
- Country: United States
- State: Nebraska
- County: Knox

Area
  - Total: 35.14 sq mi (91.01 km^{2})
  - Land: 34.83 sq mi (90.22 km^{2})
  - Water: 0.31 sq mi (0.79 km^{2}) 0.87%
- Elevation: 1,549 ft (472 m)

Population (2020)
  - Total: 67
  - Density: 1.9/sq mi (0.74/km^{2})
- GNIS feature ID: 0838263

Sparta Township is one of thirty townships in Knox County, Nebraska, United States. The population was 67 at the 2020 census. A 2023 estimate placed the township's population at 68.

== See also ==
- County government in Nebraska
