= Spade Township, Knox County, Nebraska =

Spade Township
- Township
- Location in Knox County
- Coordinates: 42°39′13″N 097°53′31″W
- Country: United States
- State: Nebraska
- County: Knox

Area
  - Total: 35.53 sq mi (92.03 km^{2})
  - Land: 35.53 sq mi (92.03 km^{2})
  - Water: 0 sq mi (0 km^{2}) 0%
- Elevation: 1,493 ft (455 m)

Population (2020)
  - Total: 64
  - Density: 1.8/sq mi (0.70/km^{2})
- GNIS feature ID: 0838262

Spade Township is one of thirty townships in Knox County, Nebraska, United States. The population was 64 at the 2020 census. A 2023 estimate placed the township's population at 63.

== See also ==
- County government in Nebraska
