= Washington Township, Knox County, Nebraska =

Washington Township
- Township
- Location in Knox County
- Coordinates: 42°37′26″N 098°14′48″W
- Country: United States
- State: Nebraska
- County: Knox

Area
  - Total: 47.8 sq mi (123.9 km^{2})
  - Land: 47.79 sq mi (123.77 km^{2})
  - Water: 0.050 sq mi (0.13 km^{2}) 0.1%
- Elevation: 1,660 ft (506 m)

Population (2020)
  - Total: 66
  - Density: 1.4/sq mi (0.53/km^{2})
- GNIS feature ID: 0838319

Washington Township is one of thirty townships in Knox County, Nebraska, United States. The population was 66 at the 2020 census. A 2023 estimate placed the township's population at 66.

== See also ==
- County government in Nebraska
