= Addison Township, Knox County, Nebraska =

Addison Township
- Township
- Location in Knox County
- Coordinates: 42°44′28″N 097°40′06″W
- Country: United States
- State: Nebraska
- County: Knox

Area
  - Total: 35.80 sq mi (92.71 km^{2})
  - Land: 35.80 sq mi (92.71 km^{2})
  - Water: 0 sq mi (0 km^{2}) 0%
- Elevation: 1,762 ft (537 m)

Population (2020)
  - Total: 125
  - Density: 3.49/sq mi (1.35/km^{2})
- GNIS feature ID: 0837844

Addison Township is one of thirty townships in Knox County, Nebraska, United States. The population was 125 at the 2020 census. A 2023 estimate placed the township's population at 125.

== See also ==
- County government in Nebraska
