= Dale Alderson =

American baseball player (1918–1982)

- Pitcher
- Born: March 9, 1918; Belden, Nebraska, U.S.
- Died: February 12, 1982 (aged 63); Garden Grove, California, U.S.
- Batted: Right Threw: Right

MLB debut
- September 18, 1943, for the Chicago Cubs

Last MLB appearance
- July 5, 1944, for the Chicago Cubs

MLB statistics
- Win–loss record: 0–1
- Earned run average: 6.56
- Strikeouts: 11
- Stats at Baseball Reference

Teams
- Chicago Cubs (1943–1944)

Dale Leonard Alderson (March 9, 1918 – February 12, 1982) was an American pitcher in Major League Baseball who played from 1943 through 1944 for the Chicago Cubs. Listed at 5 ft 10 in (1.78 m), 190 lb (86 kg), Alderson batted and threw right-handed.

A native of Belden, Nebraska and graduate of Upper Iowa University, Alderson was one of many major leaguers who saw his baseball career interrupted by a military stint during World War II. He began his professional baseball career in 1942 with the Zanesville Cubs of the Middle Atlantic League. In 1943, he pitched for the Nashville Volunteers of the Southern Association and earned a late call-up to the Chicago Cubs in late September. During the 1944 midseason, he was optioned back to Nashville, where he enlisted the Navy though he had twice been previously rejected because of a kidney ailment. He was sent to the Naval Training Center in San Diego, California and remained there until being discharged in late 1945. In 1946 he returned with the Cubs but was optioned again to Nashville. He had a 6–8 record and a 4.70 ERA with Nashville that season before retiring.

In a two-season career, Alderson posted a 0–1 record with a 6.56 ERA in 16 appearances, including three starts, giving up 30 runs (four unearned) on 52 hits and 12 walks while striking out 11 in 35 2/3 innings of work.

Alderson worked as a school teacher and coach for the Marcus-Meriden-Cleghorn Community School District in Iowa up until his death. He died while visiting his daughter Ruth in Garden Grove, California, at the age of 63.

== Personal life ==
Alderson served as a seaman first class in the United States Navy during World War II. Enlisting in 1944, he saw no action.
