= Dowling Township, Knox County, Nebraska =

Dowling Township
- Township
- Location in Knox County
- Coordinates: 42°34′18″N 097°33′00″W
- Country: United States
- State: Nebraska
- County: Knox

Area
  - Total: 36.13 sq mi (93.58 km^{2})
  - Land: 36.13 sq mi (93.58 km^{2})
  - Water: 0 sq mi (0 km^{2}) 0%
- Elevation: 1,840 ft (560 m)

Population (2020)
  - Total: 107
  - Density: 2.96/sq mi (1.14/km^{2})
- GNIS feature ID: 0837969

Dowling Township is one of thirty townships in Knox County, Nebraska, United States. The population was 107 at the 2020 census. A 2023 estimate placed the township's population at 107.

== See also ==
- County government in Nebraska
