= Peoria Township, Knox County, Nebraska =

Peoria Township
- Township
- Location in Knox County
- Coordinates: 42°39′15″N 097°39′49″W
- Country: United States
- State: Nebraska
- County: Knox

Area
  - Total: 35.69 sq mi (92.44 km^{2})
  - Land: 35.69 sq mi (92.44 km^{2})
  - Water: 0 sq mi (0 km^{2}) 0%
- Elevation: 1,795 ft (547 m)

Population (2020)
  - Total: 141
  - Density: 3.95/sq mi (1.53/km^{2})
- ZIP code: 68718
- Area codes: 402 and 531
- GNIS feature ID: 0838185

Peoria Township is one of thirty townships in Knox County, Nebraska, United States. The population was 141 at the 2020 census. A 2023 estimate placed the township's population at 140.

== See also ==
- County government in Nebraska
