= Union Township, Knox County, Nebraska =

Union Township
- Township
- Location in Knox County
- Coordinates: 42°44′14″N 097°53′40″W
- Country: United States
- State: Nebraska
- County: Knox

Area
  - Total: 34.97 sq mi (90.56 km^{2})
  - Land: 34.66 sq mi (89.77 km^{2})
  - Water: 0.31 sq mi (0.79 km^{2}) 0.87%
- Elevation: 1,463 ft (446 m)

Population (2020)
  - Total: 74
  - Density: 2.1/sq mi (0.82/km^{2})
- GNIS feature ID: 0838298

Union Township is one of thirty townships in Knox County, Nebraska, United States. The population was 74 at the 2020 census. A 2023 estimate placed the township's population at 75.

== See also ==
- County government in Nebraska
