= Hadar, Nebraska =

- Village
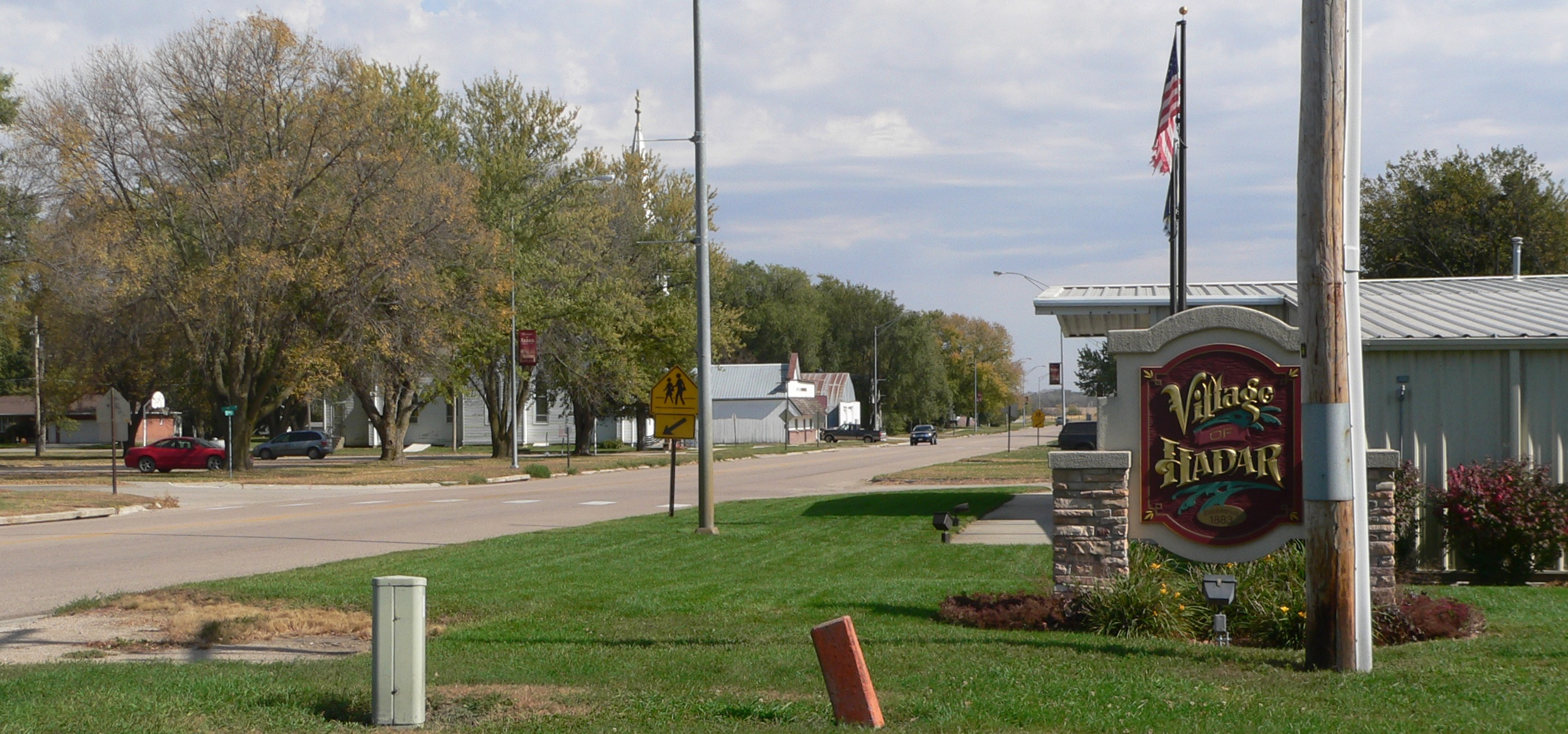
- Downtown Hadar: Main Street (Nebraska Highway 13)

- Location of Hadar, Nebraska
- Coordinates: 42°06′26″N 97°27′04″W
- Country: United States
- State: Nebraska
- County: Pierce

Area
  - Total: 0.40 sq mi (1.03 km^{2})
  - Land: 0.40 sq mi (1.03 km^{2})
  - Water: 0 sq mi (0.00 km^{2})
- Elevation: 1,555 ft (474 m)

Population (2020)
  - Total: 280
  - Density: 706.7/sq mi (272.86/km^{2})
- Time zone: UTC-6 (Central (CST))
  - Summer (DST): UTC-5 (CDT)
- ZIP code: 68738
- Area code: 402
- FIPS code: 31-20470
- GNIS feature ID: 2398220
- Website: thevillageofhadar.com

Hadar is a village in Pierce County, Nebraska, United States. It is part of the Norfolk, Nebraska Micropolitan Statistical Area. As of the 2020 census, Hadar had a population of 280.

== History ==
Hadar was platted in 1883, soon after the arrival of the railroad. The name Hadar is derived from a German word meaning "strife" or "discord", and the town was so named when the original group of German pioneers could not agree on where to settle.

== Geography ==
According to the United States Census Bureau, the village has a total area of 0.40 square miles (1.04 km^{2}), all land.

== Demographics ==
Historical population
| Census | Pop. | Note | %± |
|---|---|---|---|
| 1930 | 141 | | — |
| 1940 | 133 | | −5.7% |
| 1950 | 129 | | −3.0% |
| 1960 | 100 | | −22.5% |
| 1970 | 172 | | 72.0% |
| 1980 | 286 | | 66.3% |
| 1990 | 291 | | 1.7% |
| 2000 | 312 | | 7.2% |
| 2010 | 293 | | −6.1% |
| 2020 | 280 | | −4.4% |
U.S. Decennial Census

=== 2010 census ===
As of the census of 2010, there were 293 people, 113 households, and 87 families residing in the village. The population density was 732.5 inhabitants per square mile (282.8/km^{2}). There were 120 housing units at an average density of 300.0 per square mile (115.8/km^{2}). The racial makeup of the village was 97.6% White, 0.3% African American, 0.3% Asian, 0.7% from other races, and 1.0% from two or more races. Hispanic or Latino of any race were 1.7% of the population.

There were 113 households, of which 35.4% had children under the age of 18 living with them, 68.1% were married couples living together, 5.3% had a female householder with no husband present, 3.5% had a male householder with no wife present, and 23.0% were non-families. 21.2% of all households were made up of individuals, and 7% had someone living alone who was 65 years of age or older. The average household size was 2.59 and the average family size was 3.03.

The median age in the village was 41.2 years. 25.6% of residents were under the age of 18; 7.8% were between the ages of 18 and 24; 22.8% were from 25 to 44; 30.4% were from 45 to 64; and 13.3% were 65 years of age or older. The gender makeup of the village was 50.2% male and 49.8% female.

=== 2000 census ===
As of the census of 2000, there were 312 people, 117 households, and 82 families residing in the village. The population density was 784.9 inhabitants per square mile (303.1/km^{2}). There were 123 housing units at an average density of 309.4 per square mile (119.5/km^{2}). The racial makeup of the village was 96.79% White, 0.32% Asian, 2.24% from other races, and 0.64% from two or more races. Hispanic or Latino of any race were 2.88% of the population.

There were 117 households, out of which 37.6% had children under the age of 18 living with them, 59.8% were married couples living together, 8.5% had a female householder with no husband present, and 29.1% were non-families. 25.6% of all households were made up of individuals, and 12.0% had someone living alone who was 65 years of age or older. The average household size was 2.67 and the average family size was 3.25.

In the village, the population was spread out, with 29.8% under the age of 18, 9.0% from 18 to 24, 30.1% from 25 to 44, 19.2% from 45 to 64, and 11.9% who were 65 years of age or older. The median age was 34 years. For every 100 females, there were 113.7 males. For every 100 females age 18 and over, there were 104.7 males.

As of 2000 the median income for a household in the village was $42,679, and the median income for a family was $48,750. Males had a median income of $28,214 versus $18,750 for females. The per capita income for the village was $16,743. About 1.1% of families and 0.6% of the population were below the poverty line, including 1.2% of those under age 18 and none of those age 65 or over.

== Education ==
Immanuel Lutheran School is a Christian school of the Wisconsin Evangelical Lutheran Synod in Hadar.
