= Jelen, Nebraska =

Human settlement in Nebraska, United States

Coordinates: 42°37′41″N 98°08′45″W

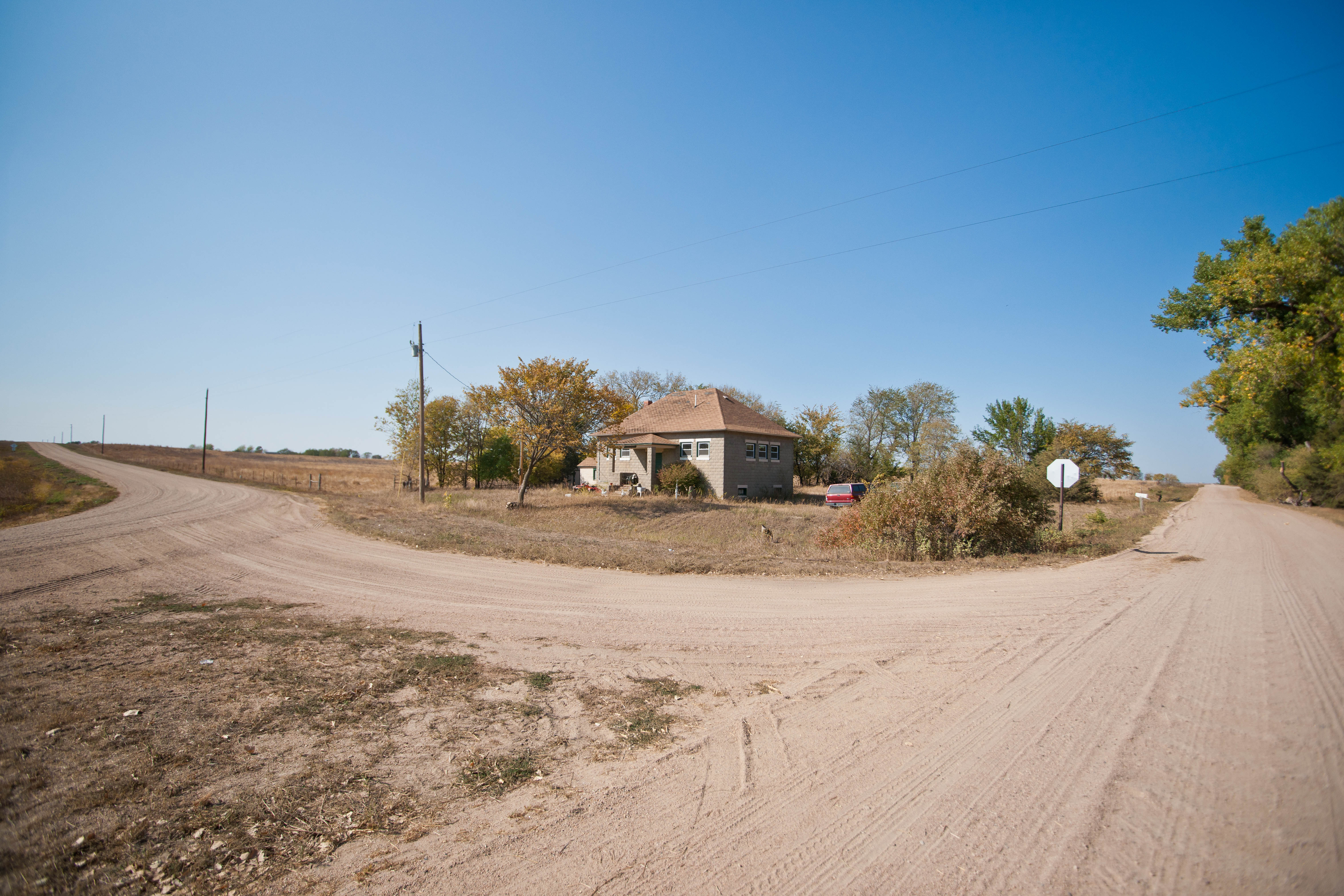
Jelen, Nebraska

Jelen is an unincorporated community in Knox County, Nebraska, United States.

== History ==
In the 1880s, Jelen was known for its large store. As the town grew, it became home to several businesses. It also had a school.

A post office was established at Jelen in 1904, and remained in operation until 1916. The community was named for the first postmaster, Anton Jelen.

In 1920, the population of Jelen was 26.
