= Walnut Grove Township, Knox County, Nebraska =

Walnut Grove Township
- Township
- Location in Knox County
- Coordinates: 42°30′08″N 098°14′31″W
- Country: United States
- State: Nebraska
- County: Knox

Area
  - Total: 53.37 sq mi (138.23 km^{2})
  - Land: 53.32 sq mi (138.11 km^{2})
  - Water: 0.046 sq mi (0.12 km^{2}) 0.09%
- Elevation: 1,740 ft (530 m)

Population (2020)
  - Total: 80
  - Density: 1.5/sq mi (0.58/km^{2})
- GNIS feature ID: 0838314

Walnut Grove Township is one of thirty townships in Knox County, Nebraska, United States. The population was 80 at the 2020 census. A 2023 estimate placed the township's population at 80.

== See also ==
- County government in Nebraska
