= Hill Township, Knox County, Nebraska =

Hill Township
- Township
- Location in Knox County
- Coordinates: 42°44′28″N 097°46′23″W
- Country: United States
- State: Nebraska
- County: Knox

Area
  - Total: 78.20 sq mi (202.53 km^{2})
  - Land: 66.90 sq mi (173.27 km^{2})
  - Water: 11.30 sq mi (29.27 km^{2}) 14.45%
- Elevation: 1,709 ft (521 m)

Population (2020)
  - Total: 761
  - Density: 11.4/sq mi (4.39/km^{2})
- GNIS feature ID: 0838057

Hill Township is one of thirty townships in Knox County, Nebraska, United States. The population was 761 at the 2020 census. A 2023 estimate placed the township's population at 763.

The Village of Santee is located within the Township.

== See also ==
- County government in Nebraska
