= Miller Township, Knox County, Nebraska =

Miller Township
- Township
- Location in Knox County
- Coordinates: 42°28′26″N 098°00′15″W
- Country: United States
- State: Nebraska
- County: Knox

Area
  - Total: 36.03 sq mi (93.33 km^{2})
  - Land: 36.00 sq mi (93.23 km^{2})
  - Water: 0.039 sq mi (0.1 km^{2}) 0.11%
- Elevation: 1,693 ft (516 m)

Population (2020)
  - Total: 150
  - Density: 4.2/sq mi (1.6/km^{2})
- GNIS feature ID: 0838140

Miller Township is one of thirty townships in Knox County, Nebraska, United States. The population was 150 at the 2020 census. A 2023 estimate placed the township's population at 149.

The Village of Winnetoon lies within the Township.

== See also ==
- County government in Nebraska
