= Knoxville, West Virginia =

Knoxville
- Unincorporated community
- Location within the state of West Virginia Knoxville (the United States)
- Coordinates: 39°53′15″N 80°38′0″W
- Country: United States
- State: West Virginia
- County: Marshall
- Elevation: 991 ft (302 m)
- Time zone: UTC-5 (Eastern (EST))
  - Summer (DST): UTC-4 (EDT)
- GNIS ID: 1541283

Knoxville is an unincorporated community in Marshall County, West Virginia, United States.

The community is named after William Knox, the proprietor of a local mill.
