= Columbia Township, Knox County, Nebraska =

Columbia Township
- Township
- Location in Knox County
- Coordinates: 42°28′57″N 097°39′41″W
- Country: United States
- State: Nebraska
- County: Knox

Area
  - Total: 35.99 sq mi (93.21 km^{2})
  - Land: 35.99 sq mi (93.21 km^{2})
  - Water: 0 sq mi (0 km^{2}) 0%
- Elevation: 1,740 ft (530 m)

Population (2020)
  - Total: 117
  - Density: 3.25/sq mi (1.26/km^{2})
- GNIS feature ID: 0837932

Columbia Township is one of thirty townships in Knox County, Nebraska, United States. The population was 117 at the 2020 census. A 2023 estimate placed the township's population at 117.

== See also ==
- County government in Nebraska
