= Herrick Township, Knox County, Nebraska =

Herrick Township
- Township
- Location in Knox County
- Coordinates: 42°49′39″N 097°39′41″W
- Country: United States
- State: Nebraska
- County: Knox

Area
  - Total: 25.28 sq mi (65.48 km^{2})
  - Land: 19.04 sq mi (49.32 km^{2})
  - Water: 6.24 sq mi (16.16 km^{2}) 24.68%
- Elevation: 1,237 ft (377 m)

Population (2020)
  - Total: 91
  - Density: 4.8/sq mi (1.8/km^{2})
- ZIP code: 68730
- Area codes: 402 and 531
- GNIS feature ID: 0838054

Herrick Township is one of thirty townships in Knox County, Nebraska, United States. The population was 91 at the 2020 census. A 2023 estimate placed the township's population at 90.

== See also ==
- County government in Nebraska
