= Dukeville, Nebraska =

Unincorporated community in Nebraska, United States

- Unincorporated community
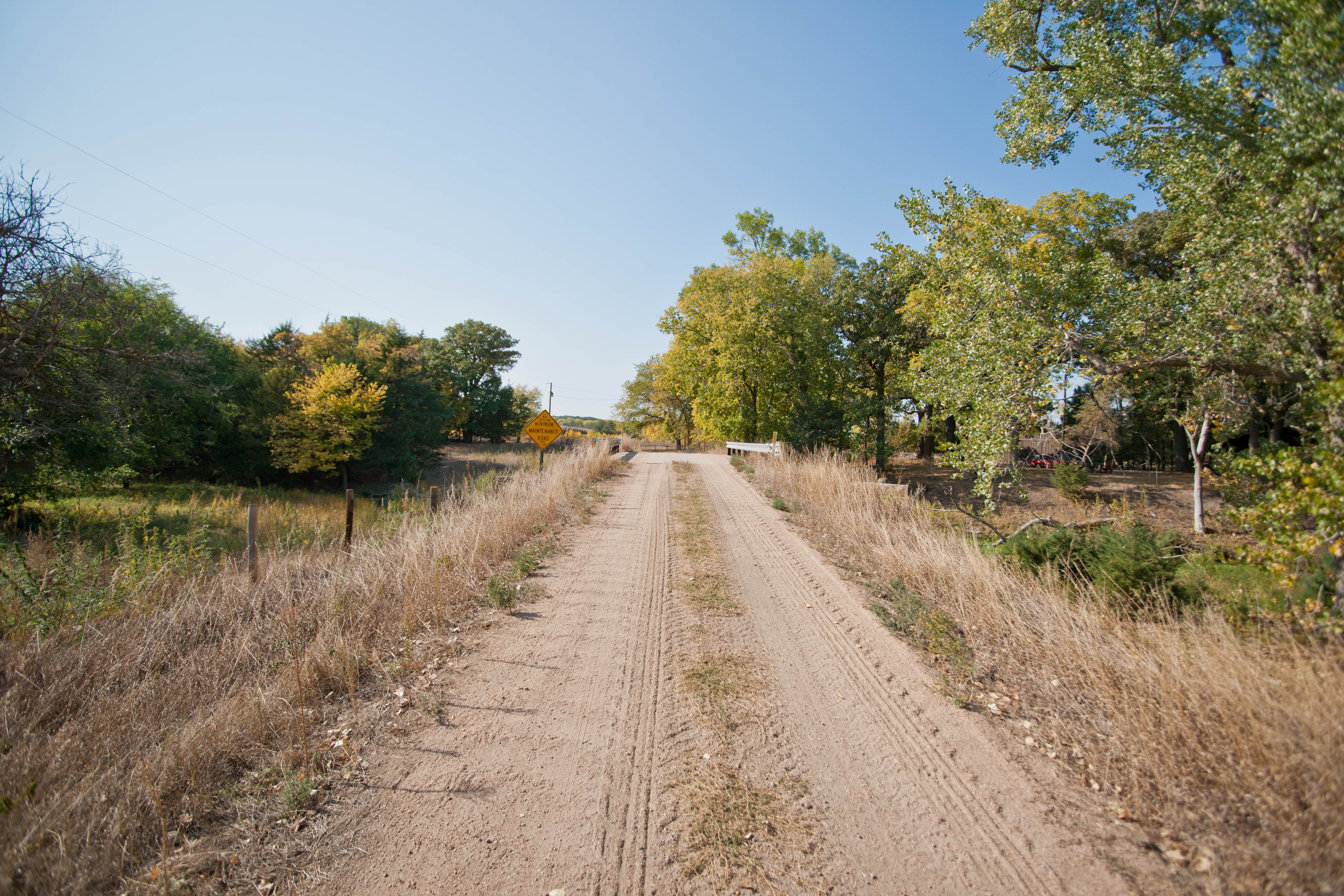

- Location within Nebraska Location within the United States
- Coordinates: 42.7°N 98.1°W
- Country: United States
- State: Nebraska
- County: Knox

Dukeville is an unincorporated community in Knox County, Nebraska, United States.

== History ==
A post office was established at Dukeville in 1875, and remained in operation until it was discontinued in 1911.

== Geography ==
Dukeville is situated on the Niobrara River, 14 miles (23 km) west of Niobrara.
