= Verdel, Nebraska =

- Village
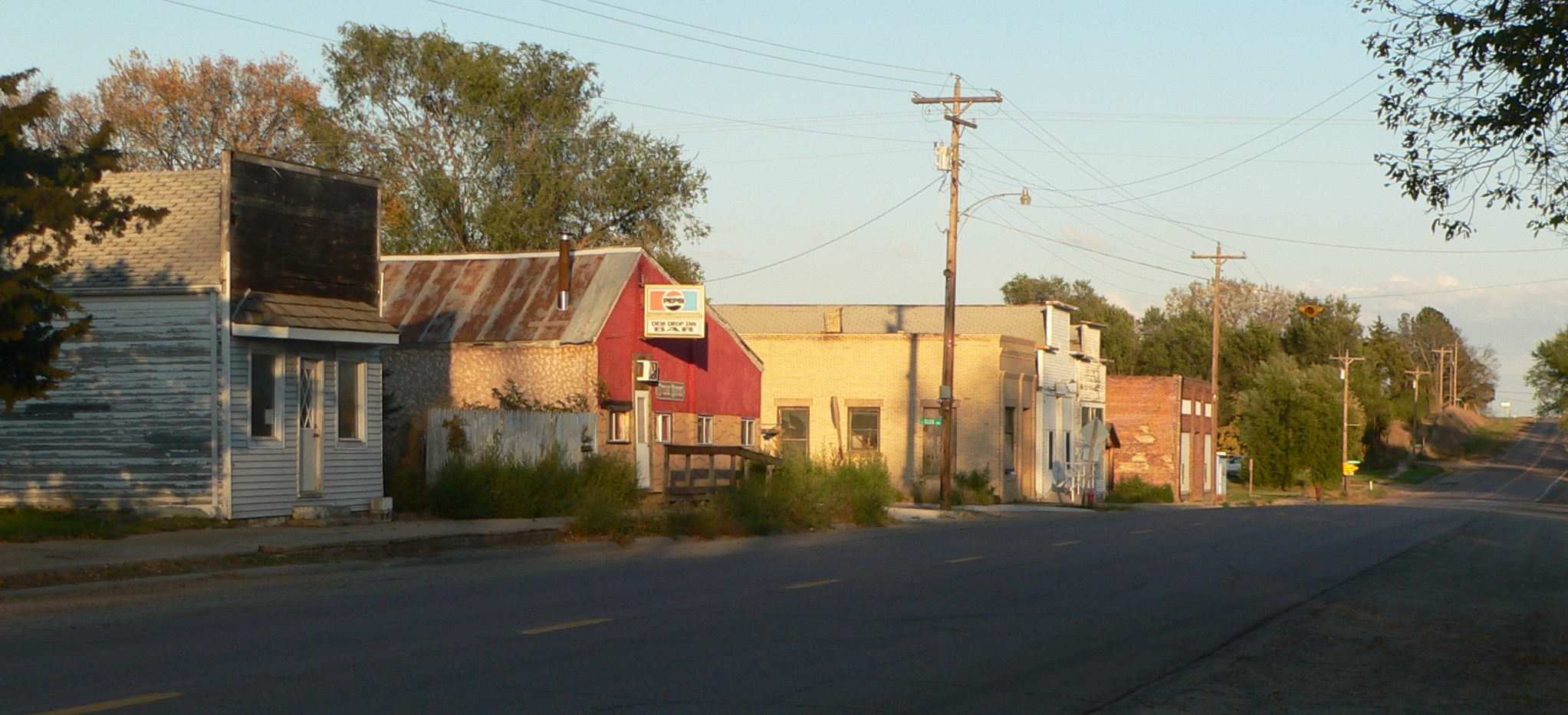
- Main Street at sundown

- Location of Verdel, Nebraska
- Coordinates: 42°48′41″N 98°11′36″W
- Country: United States
- State: Nebraska
- County: Knox

Area
  - Total: 0.17 sq mi (0.45 km^{2})
  - Land: 0.17 sq mi (0.45 km^{2})
  - Water: 0 sq mi (0.00 km^{2})
- Elevation: 1,273 ft (388 m)

Population (2020)
  - Total: 38
  - Density: 220.1/sq mi (84.99/km^{2})
- Time zone: UTC-6 (Central (CST))
  - Summer (DST): UTC-5 (CDT)
- ZIP code: 68760
- Area code: 402
- FIPS code: 31-50335
- GNIS feature ID: 2400054

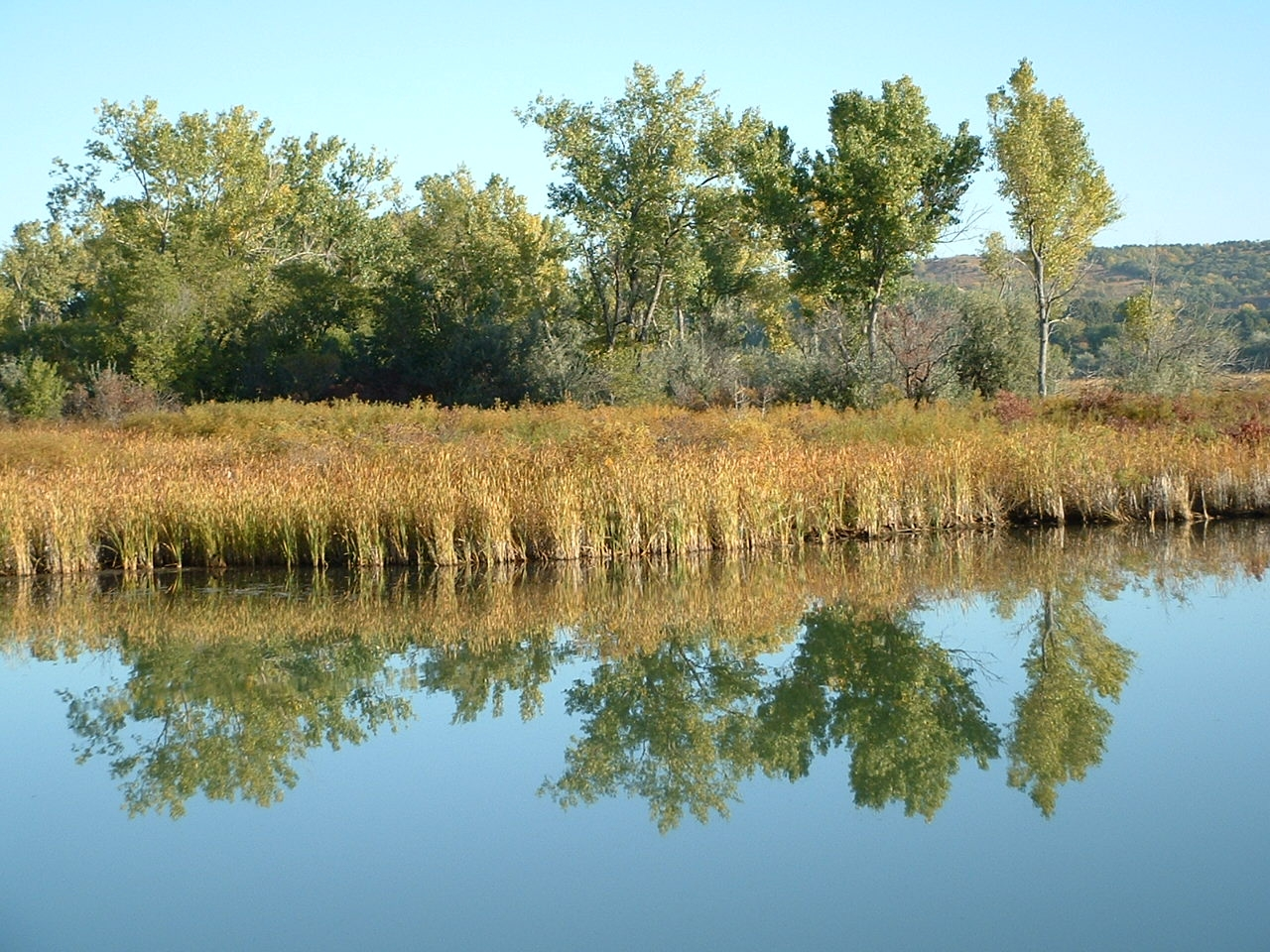
Along the South Dakota shore near Verdel

Verdel is a village in Knox County, Nebraska, United States. As of the 2020 census, Verdel had a population of 38.

== History ==
Verdel got its start at its current site circa 1902, when the Chicago and North Western Railroad was extended to that point. The name Verdel is derived from the Spanish word verde, meaning "green".

== Geography ==
According to the United States Census Bureau, the village has a total area of 0.17 square miles (0.44 km^{2}), all land.

== Demographics ==
Historical population
| Census | Pop. | Note | %± |
|---|---|---|---|
| 1910 | 162 | | — |
| 1920 | 162 | | 0.0% |
| 1930 | 155 | | −4.3% |
| 1940 | 108 | | −30.3% |
| 1950 | 142 | | 31.5% |
| 1960 | 123 | | −13.4% |
| 1970 | 74 | | −39.8% |
| 1980 | 72 | | −2.7% |
| 1990 | 59 | | −18.1% |
| 2000 | 58 | | −1.7% |
| 2010 | 30 | | −48.3% |
| 2020 | 38 | | 26.7% |
U.S. Decennial Census

=== 2010 census ===
As of the census of 2010, there were 30 people, 20 households, and 7 families living in the village. The population density was 176.5 inhabitants per square mile (68.1/km^{2}). There were 36 housing units at an average density of 211.8 per square mile (81.8/km^{2}). The racial makeup of the village was 100.0% White.

There were 20 households, of which 30.0% were married couples living together, 5.0% had a female householder with no husband present, and 65.0% were non-families. 60.0% of all households were made up of individuals, and 25% had someone living alone who was 65 years of age or older. The average household size was 1.50 and the average family size was 2.29.

The median age in the village was 60.5 years. 3.3% of residents were under the age of 18; 3.4% were between the ages of 18 and 24; 3.3% were from 25 to 44; 66.7% were from 45 to 64; and 23.3% were 65 years of age or older. The gender makeup of the village was 63.3% male and 36.7% female.

=== 2000 census ===
As of the census of 2000, there were 58 people, 32 households, and 15 families living in the village. The population density was 334.4 inhabitants per square mile (129.1/km^{2}). There were 37 housing units at an average density of 213.3 per square mile (82.4/km^{2}). The racial makeup of the village was 98.28% White and 1.72% from two or more races. Hispanic or Latino of any race were 5.17% of the population.

There were 32 households, out of which 21.9% had children under the age of 18 living with them, 40.6% were married couples living together, 6.3% had a female householder with no husband present, and 53.1% were non-families. 53.1% of all households were made up of individuals, and 25.0% had someone living alone who was 65 years of age or older. The average household size was 1.81 and the average family size was 2.67.

In the village, the population was spread out, with 17.2% under the age of 18, 5.2% from 18 to 24, 17.2% from 25 to 44, 36.2% from 45 to 64, and 24.1% who were 65 years of age or older. The median age was 52 years. For every 100 females, there were 87.1 males. For every 100 females age 18 and over, there were 100.0 males.

As of 2000 the median income for a household in the village was $15,833, and the median income for a family was $26,875. Males had a median income of $3,750 versus $17,500 for females. The per capita income for the village was $18,774. There were 28.6% of families and 23.4% of the population living below the poverty line, including 100.0% of under eighteens and 33.3% of those over 64.

== See also ==
- Ponca Fort - Located near Verdel.
