= Verdigre Township, Knox County, Nebraska =

Verdigre Township
- Township
- Location in Knox County
- Coordinates: 42°34′11″N 098°00′44″W
- Country: United States
- State: Nebraska
- County: Knox

Area
  - Total: 35.73 sq mi (92.55 km^{2})
  - Land: 35.54 sq mi (92.06 km^{2})
  - Water: 0.19 sq mi (0.5 km^{2}) 0.54%
- Elevation: 1,440 ft (440 m)

Population (2020)
  - Total: 631
  - Density: 17.8/sq mi (6.85/km^{2})
- GNIS feature ID: 0838303

Verdigre Township is one of thirty townships in Knox County, Nebraska, United States. The population was 631 at the 2020 census. A 2023 estimate placed the township's population at 621.

The Village of Verdigre lies within the Township.

== See also ==
- County government in Nebraska
