= Knoxville, Nebraska =

Unincorporated community in Nebraska, U.S.

Coordinates: 42°40′07″N 98°17′47″W

Knoxville is an unincorporated community in Knox County, Nebraska, United States.

== History ==
A post office was established at Knoxville in 1879, and remained in operation until it discontinued in 1931. An early settler being a native of Knoxville, Illinois caused the name to be selected.
