= Bazile Mills, Nebraska =

- Village
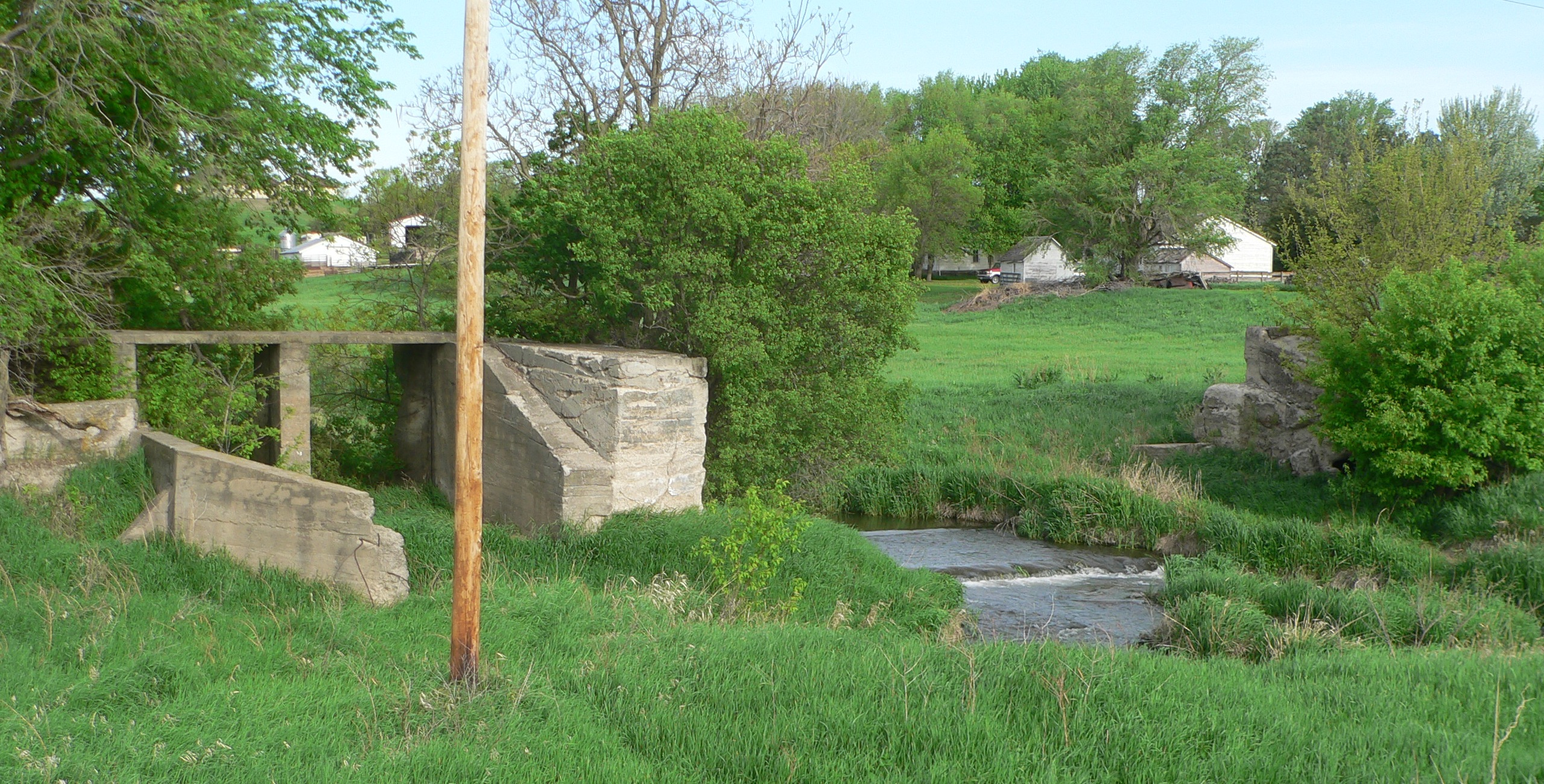
- Remains of dam on Bazile Creek

- Location of Bazile Mills, Nebraska
- Coordinates: 42°30′45″N 97°54′30″W
- Country: United States
- State: Nebraska
- County: Knox

Area
  - Total: 0.49 sq mi (1.27 km^{2})
  - Land: 0.49 sq mi (1.27 km^{2})
  - Water: 0 sq mi (0.00 km^{2})
- Elevation: 1,611 ft (491 m)

Population (2020)
  - Total: 24
  - Estimate (2021): 24
  - Density: 53.2/sq mi (20.55/km^{2})
- Time zone: UTC-6 (Central (CST))
  - Summer (DST): UTC-5 (CDT)
- ZIP code: 68729
- Area codes: 402 and 531
- FIPS code: 31-03355
- GNIS feature ID: 2398054

Bazile Mills is a village in Knox County, Nebraska, United States. The population was 24 at the 2020 census.

== History ==
Bazile Mills was laid out in 1878. The community was named for a nearby watermill on Bazile Creek.

== Geography ==
According to the United States Census Bureau, the village has a total area of 0.49 square miles (1.27 km^{2}), all land.

== Demographics ==
Historical population
| Census | Pop. | Note | %± |
|---|---|---|---|
| 1880 | 41 | | — |
| 1910 | 77 | | — |
| 1920 | 91 | | 18.2% |
| 1930 | 76 | | −16.5% |
| 1940 | 76 | | 0.0% |
| 1950 | 46 | | −39.5% |
| 1960 | 45 | | −2.2% |
| 1970 | 44 | | −2.2% |
| 1980 | 54 | | 22.7% |
| 1990 | 34 | | −37.0% |
| 2000 | 26 | | −23.5% |
| 2010 | 29 | | 11.5% |
| 2020 | 26 | | −10.3% |
U.S. Decennial Census

=== 2010 census ===
As of the census of 2010, there were 29 people, 11 households, and 10 families living in the village. The population density was 59.2 inhabitants per square mile (22.9/km^{2}). There were 14 housing units at an average density of 28.6 per square mile (11.0/km^{2}). The racial makeup of the village was 89.7% White, 6.9% Asian, and 3.4% from two or more races.

There were 11 households, of which 36.4% had children under the age of 18 living with them, 90.9% were married couples living together, and 9.1% were non-families. 9.1% of all households were made up of individuals. The average household size was 2.64 and the average family size was 2.80.

The median age in the village was 52.5 years. 24.1% of residents were under the age of 18; 3.3% were between the ages of 18 and 24; 13.8% were from 25 to 44; 37.9% were from 45 to 64; and 20.7% were 65 years of age or older. The gender makeup of the village was 48.3% male and 51.7% female.

=== 2000 census ===
As of the census of 2000, there were 26 people, 11 households, and 8 families living in the village. The population density was 53.1 inhabitants per square mile (20.5/km^{2}). There were 15 housing units at an average density of 30.7 per square mile (11.9/km^{2}). The racial makeup of the village was 100.00% White.

There were 11 households, out of which 18.2% had children under the age of 18 living with them, 81.8% were married couples living together, and 18.2% were non-families. 18.2% of all households were made up of individuals, and none had someone living alone who was 65 years of age or older. The average household size was 2.36 and the average family size was 2.67.

In the village, the population was spread out, with 15.4% under the age of 18, 3.8% from 18 to 24, 34.6% from 25 to 44, 26.9% from 45 to 64, and 19.2% who were 65 years of age or older. The median age was 45 years. For every 100 females, there were 160.0 males. For every 100 females age 18 and over, there were 120.0 males.

As of 2000 the median income for a household in the village was $35,000, and the median income for a family was $35,000. Males had a median income of $21,250 versus $16,250 for females. The per capita income for the village was $14,444. None of the population and none of the families were below the poverty line.
