= Western Township, Knox County, Nebraska =

Western Township
- Township
- Location in Knox County
- Coordinates: 42°42′37″N 098°15′00″W
- Country: United States
- State: Nebraska
- County: Knox

Area
  - Total: 28.09 sq mi (72.75 km^{2})
  - Land: 28.00 sq mi (72.52 km^{2})
  - Water: 0.089 sq mi (0.23 km^{2}) 0.32%
- Elevation: 1,486 ft (453 m)

Population (2020)
  - Total: 51
  - Density: 1.8/sq mi (0.70/km^{2})
- GNIS feature ID: 0838324

Western Township is one of thirty townships in Knox County, Nebraska, United States. The population was 51 at the 2020 census. A 2023 estimate placed the township's population at 50.

== See also ==
- County government in Nebraska
