= Niobrara Township, Knox County, Nebraska =

Niobrara Township
- Township
- Location in Knox County
- Coordinates: 42°43′21″N 097°59′58″W
- Country: United States
- State: Nebraska
- County: Knox

Area
  - Total: 23.39 sq mi (60.57 km^{2})
  - Land: 22.44 sq mi (58.12 km^{2})
  - Water: 0.95 sq mi (2.45 km^{2}) 4.04%
- Elevation: 1,483 ft (452 m)

Population (2020)
  - Total: 418
  - Density: 18.6/sq mi (7.19/km^{2})
- GNIS feature ID: 0838159

Niobrara Township is one of thirty townships in Knox County, Nebraska, United States. The population was 418 at the 2020 census. A 2023 estimate placed the township's population at 414.

The Village of Niobrara lies within the Township.

== See also ==
- County government in Nebraska
