= Eastern Township, Knox County, Nebraska =

Eastern Township
- Township
- Location in Knox County
- Coordinates: 42°44′32″N 097°32′47″W
- Country: United States
- State: Nebraska
- County: Knox

Area
  - Total: 35.52 sq mi (91.99 km^{2})
  - Land: 35.52 sq mi (91.99 km^{2})
  - Water: 0 sq mi (0 km^{2}) 0%
- Elevation: 1,440 ft (440 m)

Population (2020)
  - Total: 255
  - Density: 7.18/sq mi (2.77/km^{2})
- ZIP code: 68730
- Area codes: 402 and 531
- GNIS feature ID: 0837972

Eastern Township is one of thirty townships in Knox County, Nebraska, United States. The population was 255 at the 2020 census. A 2023 estimate placed the township's population at 255.

== See also ==
- County government in Nebraska
