= Center, Nebraska =

Village in and county seat of Knox County, Nebraska, United States

- Village
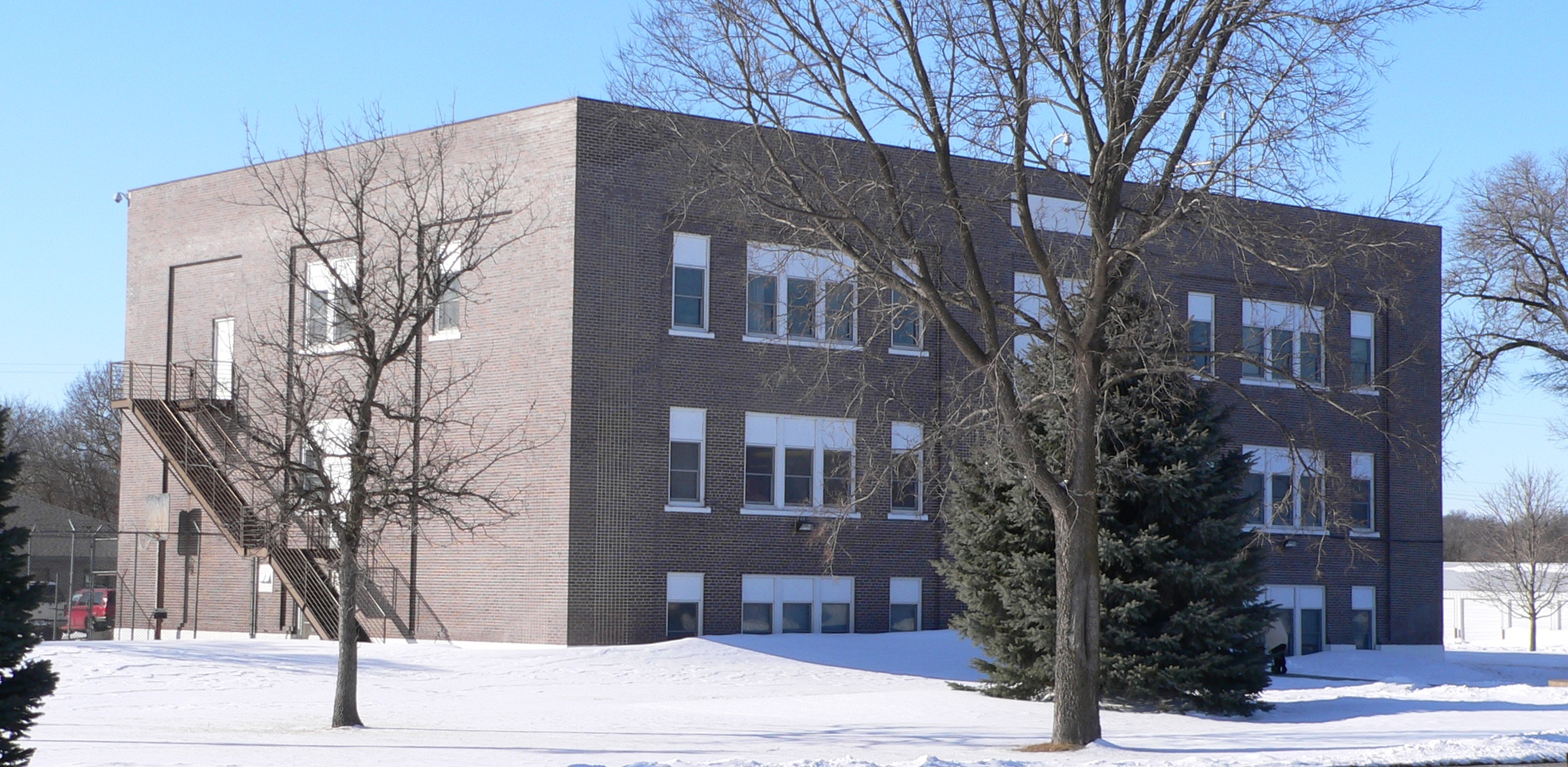
- Knox County courthouse in Center

- Location of Center, Nebraska
- Coordinates: 42°36′32″N 97°52′34″W
- Country: United States
- State: Nebraska
- County: Knox

Area
  - Total: 0.10 sq mi (0.27 km^{2})
  - Land: 0.10 sq mi (0.27 km^{2})
  - Water: 0 sq mi (0.00 km^{2})
- Elevation: 1,398 ft (426 m)

Population (2020)
  - Total: 73
  - Estimate (2021): 73
  - Density: 700/sq mi (270/km^{2})
- Time zone: UTC-6 (Central (CST))
  - Summer (DST): UTC-5 (CDT)
- ZIP code: 68724
- Area code: 402
- FIPS code: 31-08360
- GNIS feature ID: 2397587

Center is a village in and the county seat of Knox County, Nebraska, United States. The population was 73 at the 2020 census.

== History ==
Center was platted in 1901. It was named from its location near the geographical center of Knox County. Center was incorporated as a village in 1904.

== Geography ==
Center lies at the junction of Nebraska Highway 84, which runs east and west, and Nebraska Highway 13, the northern terminus of which is at Center. Bazile Creek passes through the outskirts of the village.

According to the United States Census Bureau, the village has a total area of 0.10 square miles (0.26 km^{2}), all land.

== Demographics ==
Historical population
Census	Pop.	Note	%±
1910	119		—
1920	198		66.4%
1930	130		−34.3%
1940	146		12.3%
1950	148		1.4%
1960	147		−0.7%
1970	111		−24.5%
1980	123		10.8%
1990	112		−8.9%
2000	90		−19.6%
2010	94		4.4%
2020	79		−16.0%
U.S. Decennial Census

=== 2010 census ===
As of the census of 2010, there were 94 people, 39 households, and 25 families living in the village. The population density was 940.0 inhabitants per square mile (362.9/km^{2}). There were 51 housing units at an average density of 510.0 per square mile (196.9/km^{2}). The racial makeup of the village was 88.3% White, 6.4% Native American, 1.1% from other races, and 4.3% from two or more races. Hispanic or Latino of any race were 6.4% of the population.

There were 39 households, of which 23.1% had children under the age of 18 living with them, 51.3% were married couples living together, 7.7% had a female householder with no husband present, 5.1% had a male householder with no wife present, and 35.9% were non-families. 30.8% of all households were made up of individuals, and 18% had someone living alone who was 65 years of age or older. The average household size was 2.26 and the average family size was 2.88.

The median age in the village was 49.5 years. 23.4% of residents were under the age of 18; 5.3% were between the ages of 18 and 24; 16% were from 25 to 44; 35.1% were from 45 to 64; and 20.2% were 65 years of age or older. The gender makeup of the village was 54.3% male and 45.7% female.

=== 2000 census ===
As of the census of 2000, there were 90 people, 43 households, and 23 families living in the village. The population density was 840.0 inhabitants per square mile (324.3/km^{2}). There were 49 housing units at an average density of 457.4 per square mile (176.6/km^{2}). The racial makeup of the village was 95.56% White, 4.44% from other races. Hispanic or Latino of any race were 8.89% of the population.

There were 43 households, out of which 23.3% had children under the age of 18 living with them, 51.2% were married couples living together, and 44.2% were non-families. 41.9% of all households were made up of individuals, and 25.6% had someone living alone who was 65 years of age or older. The average household size was 2.09 and the average family size was 2.92.

In the village, the population was spread out, with 24.4% under the age of 18, 5.6% from 18 to 24, 20.0% from 25 to 44, 24.4% from 45 to 64, and 25.6% who were 65 years of age or older. The median age was 46 years. For every 100 females, there were 104.5 males. For every 100 females age 18 and over, there were 106.1 males.

As of 2000 the median income for a household in the village was $24,643, and the median income for a family was $31,500. Males had a median income of $26,250 versus $23,750 for females. The per capita income for the village was $12,277. There were 6.7% of families and 6.5% of the population living below the poverty line, including none of those under 18 and 20.7% of those over 64.

== See also ==
- List of municipalities in Nebraska
