= Belden, Nebraska =

- Village
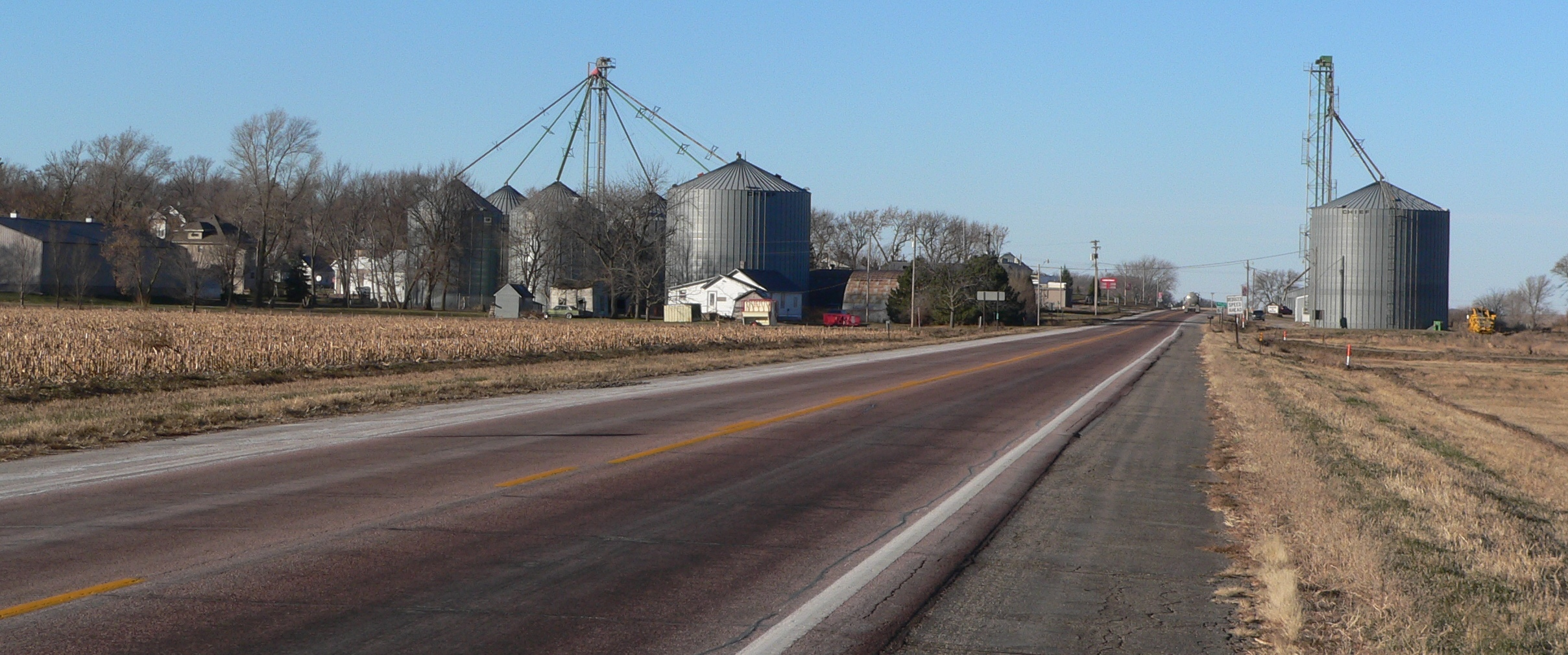
- Belden, seen from the east along U.S. Highway 20

- Location of Belden, Nebraska
- Coordinates: 42°24′42″N 97°12′27″W
- Country: United States
- State: Nebraska
- County: Cedar

Area
  - Total: 0.15 sq mi (0.39 km^{2})
  - Land: 0.15 sq mi (0.39 km^{2})
  - Water: 0 sq mi (0.00 km^{2})
- Elevation: 1,581 ft (482 m)

Population (2020)
  - Total: 112
  - Estimate (2021): 111
  - Density: 740/sq mi (290/km^{2})
- Time zone: UTC-6 (Central (CST))
  - Summer (DST): UTC-5 (CDT)
- ZIP code: 68717
- Area code: 402
- FIPS code: 31-03775
- GNIS feature ID: 2398069

Belden is a village in Cedar County, Nebraska, United States. The population was 112 at the 2020 census.

== History ==
Belden got its start following construction of the railroad through the territory. It was named for Scott Belden, a railroad official.

== Geography ==
According to the United States Census Bureau, the village has a total area of 0.15 square miles (0.39 km^{2}), all land.

U.S. Route 20 and Nebraska Highway 57 serve the community.

== Demographics ==
Historical population
Census	Pop.	Note	%±
1900	197		—
1910	247		25.4%
1920	285		15.4%
1930	248		−13.0%
1940	235		−5.2%
1950	192		−18.3%
1960	157		−18.2%
1970	162		3.2%
1980	151		−6.8%
1990	149		−1.3%
2000	131		−12.1%
2010	115		−12.2%
2020	113		−1.7%
U.S. Decennial Census

=== 2010 census ===
As of the census of 2010, there were 115 people, 48 households, and 38 families living in the village. The population density was 766.7 inhabitants per square mile (296.0/km^{2}). There were 65 housing units at an average density of 433.3 per square mile (167.3/km^{2}). The racial makeup of the village was 100.0% White.

There were 48 households, of which 29.2% had children under the age of 18 living with them, 64.6% were married couples living together, 8.3% had a female householder with no husband present, 6.3% had a male householder with no wife present, and 20.8% were non-families. 18.8% of all households were made up of individuals, and 10.5% had someone living alone who was 65 years of age or older. The average household size was 2.40 and the average family size was 2.68.

The median age in the village was 43.3 years. 22.6% of residents were under the age of 18; 6.9% were between the ages of 18 and 24; 22.7% were from 25 to 44; 33% were from 45 to 64; and 14.8% were 65 years of age or older. The gender makeup of the village was 47.8% male and 52.2% female.

=== 2000 census ===
As of the census of 2000, there were 131 people, 52 households, and 37 families living in the village. The population density was 839.2 inhabitants per square mile (324.0/km^{2}). There were 61 housing units at an average density of 390.8 per square mile (150.9/km^{2}). The racial makeup of the village was 100.00% White.

There were 52 households, out of which 26.9% had children under the age of 18 living with them, 61.5% were married couples living together, 7.7% had a female householder with no husband present, and 28.8% were non-families. 25.0% of all households were made up of individuals, and 21.2% had someone living alone who was 65 years of age or older. The average household size was 2.52 and the average family size was 3.00.

In the village, the population was spread out, with 26.0% under the age of 18, 7.6% from 18 to 24, 19.8% from 25 to 44, 25.2% from 45 to 64, and 21.4% who were 65 years of age or older. The median age was 39 years. For every 100 females, there were 89.9 males. For every 100 females age 18 and over, there were 83.0 males.

As of 2000 the median income for a household in the village was $43,000, and the median income for a family was $48,542. Males had a median income of $30,000 versus $28,750 for females. The per capita income for the village was $20,581. There were no families and 2.9% of the population living below the poverty line, including no under eighteens and 5.3% of those over 64.

== Notable person ==
- Dale Alderson, baseball player
