= Bloomfield, Nebraska =

- City
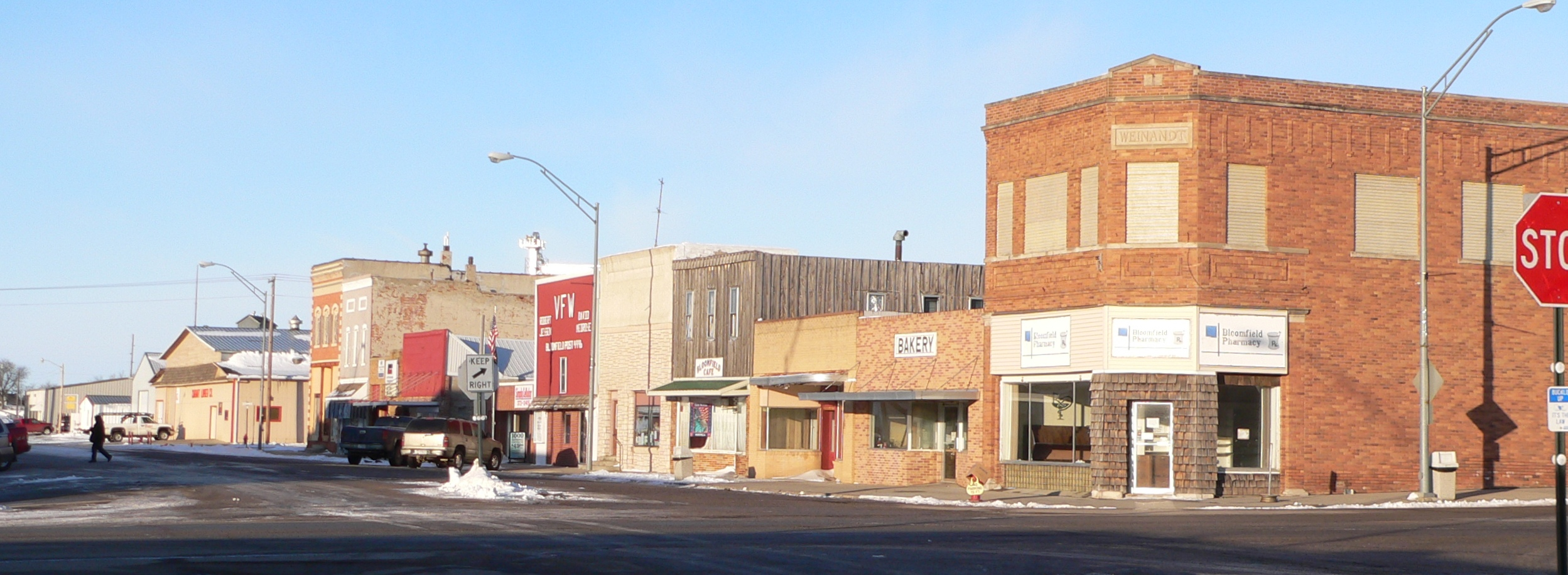
- Downtown Bloomfield: east side of Broadway north of Main

- Location of Bloomfield, Nebraska
- Coordinates: 42°35′54″N 97°38′53″W
- Country: United States
- State: Nebraska
- County: Knox

Area
  - Total: 0.81 sq mi (2.11 km^{2})
  - Land: 0.81 sq mi (2.11 km^{2})
  - Water: 0 sq mi (0.00 km^{2})
- Elevation: 1,693 ft (516 m)

Population (2020)
  - Total: 986
  - Density: 1,208.1/sq mi (466.45/km^{2})
- Time zone: UTC-6 (Central (CST))
  - Summer (DST): UTC-5 (CDT)
- ZIP code: 68718
- Area code: 402
- FIPS code: 31-05455
- GNIS feature ID: 837886
- Website: https://bloomfieldnebraska.com/

Bloomfield is a city in Knox County, Nebraska, United States. As of the 2020 census, Bloomfield had a population of 986.

== History ==
Bloomfield was founded in 1890. It was named for Bloomfield Dyer, the original owner of the town site.

== Knox County Fair ==
The Knox County Fair is held annually in August in Bloomfield at the Knox County Fair Grounds. The fair primary consists of a concert, midway, and 4-H/FFA activities.

== Geography ==
According to the United States Census Bureau, the city has a total area of 0.82 square miles (2.12 km^{2}), all land.

== Climate ==
Climate data for Bloomfield, NE (1991-2020, coordinates:42.5939°N 97.6436°W)
Month	Jan	Feb	Mar	Apr	May	Jun	Jul	Aug	Sep	Oct	Nov	Dec	Year
Average precipitation inches (mm)	0.60 (15)	0.98 (25)	1.56 (40)	3.04 (77)	4.39 (112)	4.05 (103)	3.26 (83)	3.30 (84)	2.96 (75)	2.56 (65)	1.08 (27)	0.82 (21)	28.6 (727)
Average snowfall inches (cm)	7.2 (18)	8.8 (22)	6.3 (16)	4.8 (12)	0.3 (0.76)	0.0 (0.0)	0.0 (0.0)	0.0 (0.0)	0.0 (0.0)	1.1 (2.8)	5.9 (15)	7.3 (19)	41.7 (105.56)
Average extreme snow depth inches (cm)	7 (18)	8 (20)	5 (13)	3 (7.6)	0 (0)	0 (0)	0 (0)	0 (0)	0 (0)	1 (2.5)	4 (10)	5 (13)	8 (20)
Average precipitation days (≥ 0.01 in)	6.2	5.8	7.4	10.1	12.6	11.4	8.6	9.5	7.4	7.9	5.4	5.8	98.1
Average snowy days (≥ 0.01 in)	5.6	5.2	3.9	2.0	0.1	0	0	0	0	0.7	2.4	5	24.9
Source: NOAA

== Demographics ==
Historical population
Census	Pop.	Note	%±
1900	678		—
1910	1,264		86.4%
1920	1,431		13.2%
1930	1,435		0.3%
1940	1,467		2.2%
1950	1,455		−0.8%
1960	1,349		−7.3%
1970	1,287		−4.6%
1980	1,393		8.2%
1990	1,181		−15.2%
2000	1,126		−4.7%
2010	1,028		−8.7%
2020	986		−4.1%
U.S. Decennial Census

=== 2010 census ===
As of the census of 2010, there were 1,028 people, 500 households, and 275 families living in the city. The population density was 1,253.7 inhabitants per square mile (484.1/km^{2}). There were 565 housing units at an average density of 689.0 units per square mile (266.0 units/km^{2}). The racial makeup of the city was 95.9% White, 2.0% Native American, 0.1% Asian, 0.2% from other races, and 1.8% from two or more races. Hispanic or Latino of any race were 2.0% of the population.

There were 500 households, of which 20.2% had children under the age of 18 living with them, 42.8% were married couples living together, 8.0% had a female householder with no husband present, 4.2% had a male householder with no wife present, and 45.0% were non-families. 41.6% of all households were made up of individuals, and 24% had someone living alone who was 65 years of age or older. The average household size was 1.96 and the average family size was 2.62.

The median age in the city was 53.1 years. 17.6% of residents were under the age of 18; 4.3% were between the ages of 18 and 24; 17.5% were from 25 to 44; 29.9% were from 45 to 64; and 30.9% were 65 years of age or older. The gender makeup of the city was 46.3% male and 53.7% female.

=== 2000 census ===
As of the census of 2000, there were 1,126 people, 521 households, and 300 families living in the city. The population density was 1,380.2 inhabitants per square mile (532.9/km^{2}). There were 587 housing units at an average density of 719.5 units per square mile (277.8 units/km^{2}). The racial makeup of the city was 98.31% White, 0.89% Native American, 0.09% Asian, and 0.71% from two or more races. Hispanic or Latino of any race were 0.27% of the population.

There were 521 households, out of which 19.0% had children under the age of 18 living with them, 50.3% were married couples living together, 5.8% had a female householder with no husband present, and 42.4% were non-families. 38.8% of all households were made up of individuals, and 26.1% had someone living alone who was 65 years of age or older. The average household size was 2.01 and the average family size was 2.65.

In the city, the population was spread out, with 17.3% under the age of 18, 5.6% from 18 to 24, 18.0% from 25 to 44, 22.7% from 45 to 64, and 36.3% who were 65 years of age or older. The median age was 52 years. For every 100 females, there were 80.2 males. For every 100 females age 18 and over, there were 77.7 males.

As of 2000 the median income for a household in the city was $25,435, and the median income for a family was $36,705. Males had a median income of $27,426 versus $17,273 for females. The per capita income for the city was $15,562. About 5.6% of families and 10.9% of the population were below the poverty line, including 11.3% of those under age 18 and 13.2% of those age 65 or over.

== Transportation ==
The Bloomfield Municipal Airport is located two nautical miles (2.3 mi; 3.7 km) southwest of Bloomfield's central business district.
