= Columbia Township, Boone County, Missouri =

Columbia Township
- Township
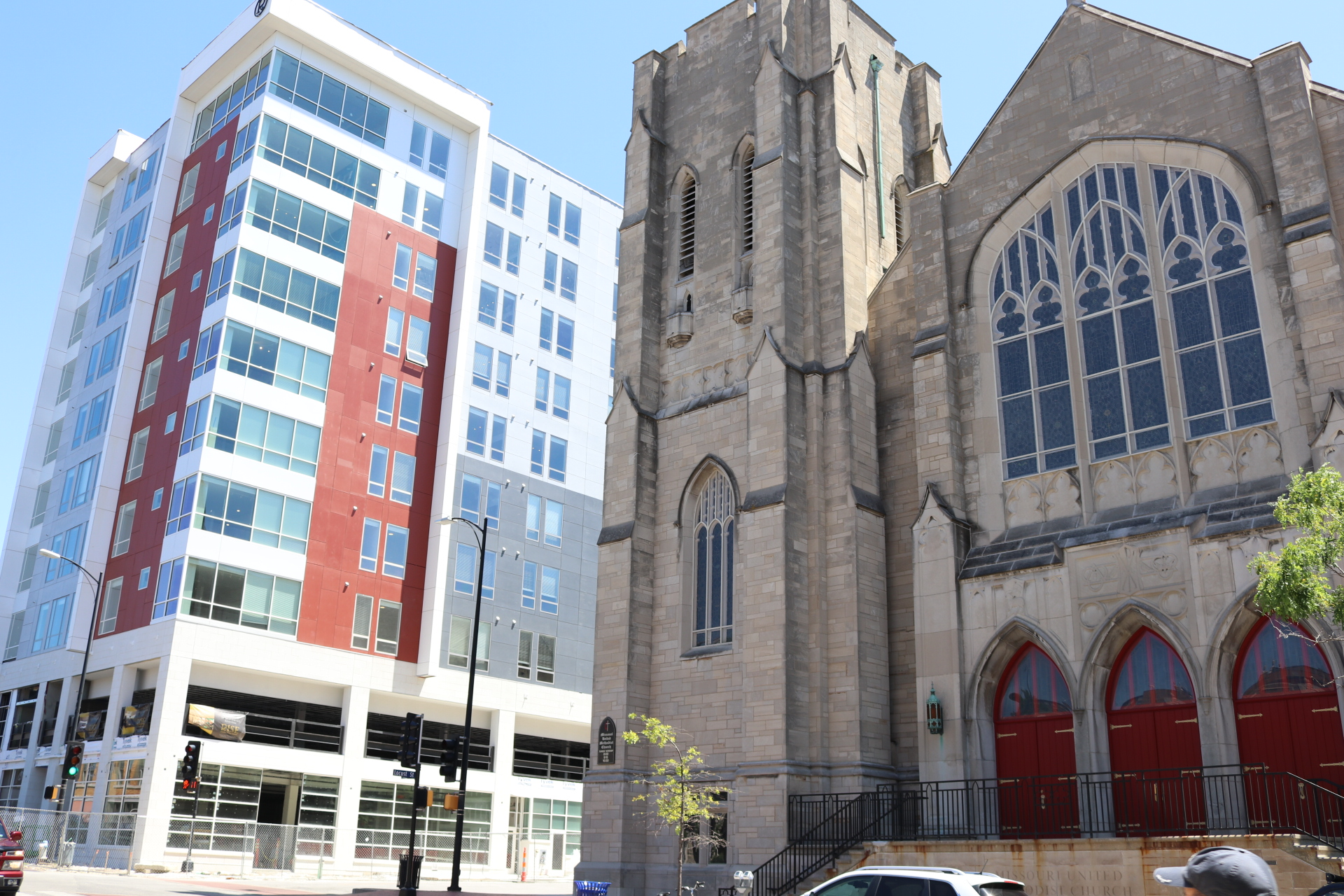
- Interactive map of Columbia Township
- Coordinates: 38°57′23″N 92°14′20″W
- Country: United States
- State: Missouri
- County: Boone

Area
  - Total: 80.6 sq mi (209 km^{2})
  - Land: 80.3 sq mi (208 km^{2})
  - Water: 0.3 sq mi (0.78 km^{2})

Population (2012)
  - Total: 41,475
  - Density: 517/sq mi (199/km^{2})
- Area code: 573
- GNIS feature ID: 766332

Columbia Township is one of ten townships in Boone County, Missouri, USA. As of 2012, its population was 41,475. The township contains the eastern half of the City of Columbia including most of the original (downtown) area.

== History ==
Columbia Township was established in 1821. Settled mainly by settlers from the upland south (Kentucky, Virginia, and Tennessee), the township was named after its original city Columbia, founded along the Flat Branch and county seat of Boone County.

== Geography ==
Columbia Township covers an area of 80.6 square miles (209 km^{2}) and is located in central and eastern Boone County. The township contains one incorporated settlement: Columbia. The unincorporated community of Shaw is also within the bounds. Hydrologically, the area is mainly drained by Hinkson Creek. Other waterways include: the Flat Branch, Grindstone Creek, Gans Creek, and Clear Creek.
