= Central Township, Merrick County, Nebraska =

Central Township
- Township
- Location in Merrick County
- Coordinates: 41°10′05″N 097°54′37″W
- Country: United States
- State: Nebraska
- County: Merrick

Area
  - Total: 16.30 sq mi (42.22 km^{2})
  - Land: 15.45 sq mi (40.01 km^{2})
  - Water: 0.85 sq mi (2.21 km^{2}) 5.23%
- Elevation: 1,657 ft (505 m)

Population (2020)
  - Total: 62
  - Density: 4.0/sq mi (1.5/km^{2})
- GNIS feature ID: 0837912

Central Township is one of eleven townships in Merrick County, Nebraska, United States. The population was 62 at the 2020 census. A 2021 estimate placed the township's population at 62.

== See also ==
- County government in Nebraska
