= Central Township, Knox County, Nebraska =

Central Township
- Township
- Location in Knox County
- Coordinates: 42°34′29″N 097°46′36″W
- Country: United States
- State: Nebraska
- County: Knox

Area
  - Total: 35.97 sq mi (93.15 km^{2})
  - Land: 35.97 sq mi (93.15 km^{2})
  - Water: 0 sq mi (0 km^{2}) 0%
- Elevation: 1,591 ft (485 m)

Population (2020)
  - Total: 80
  - Density: 2.2/sq mi (0.86/km^{2})
- GNIS feature ID: 0837911

Central Township is one of thirty townships in Knox County, Nebraska, United States. The population was 80 at the 2020 census. A 2023 estimate placed the township's population at 80.

== See also ==
- County government in Nebraska
