= Creighton, Nebraska =

- City
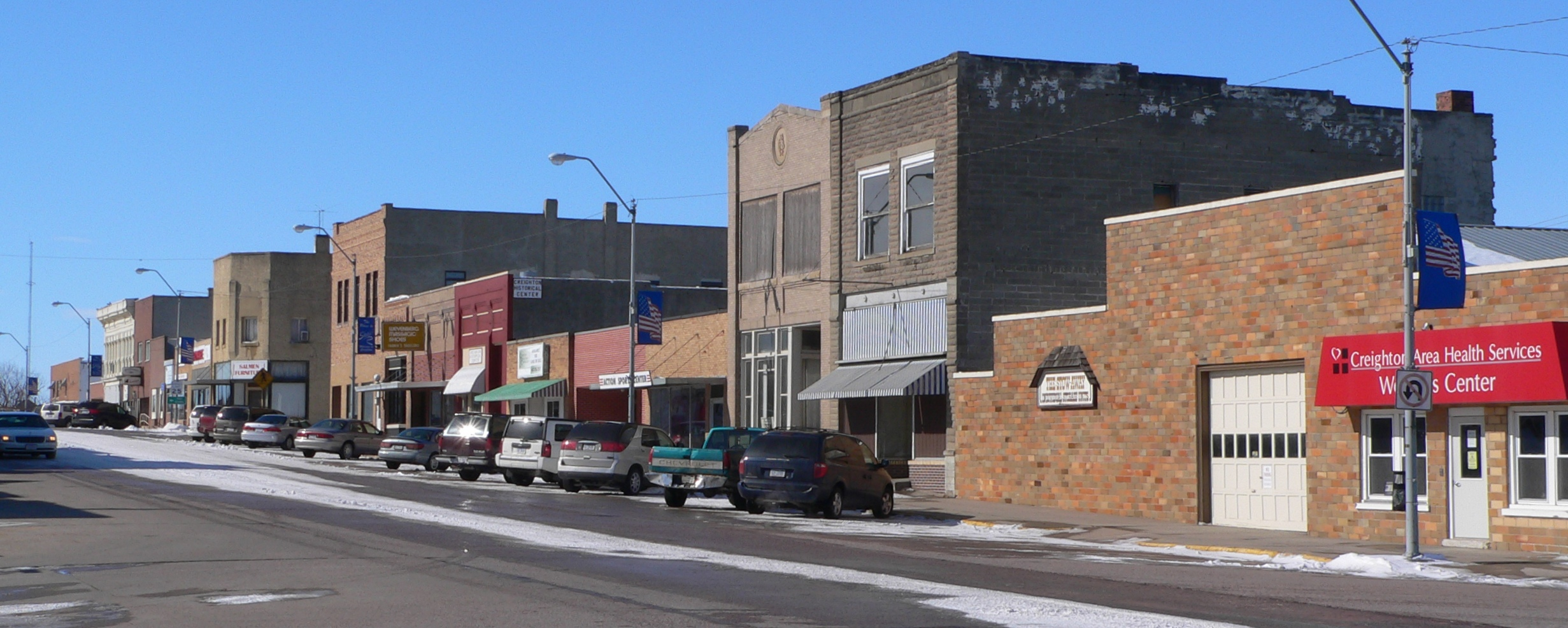
- Downtown Creighton: north side of Main Street looking west from Chase Avenue

- Location of Creighton, Nebraska
- Coordinates: 42°27′53″N 97°54′26″W
- Country: United States
- State: Nebraska
- County: Knox

Area
  - Total: 1.21 sq mi (3.13 km^{2})
  - Land: 1.21 sq mi (3.13 km^{2})
  - Water: 0 sq mi (0.00 km^{2})
- Elevation: 1,647 ft (502 m)

Population (2020)
  - Total: 1,147
  - Density: 948.0/sq mi (366.01/km^{2})
- Time zone: UTC-6 (Central (CST))
  - Summer (DST): UTC-5 (CDT)
- ZIP code: 68729
- Area code: 402
- FIPS code: 31-11230
- GNIS feature ID: 837947
- Website: www.creighton.org

Creighton is a city in Knox County, Nebraska, United States. The population was 1,147 at the 2020 census.

== History ==
The City of Creighton developed as a result of the “Bruce Colony” settlement in 1871. A charter was obtained in 1874 to plat the north side of what is now the mile-long Main Street. Some say the town was named for Edward Creighton, while others claim it was for John, for whom Creighton University was named. The most plausible explanation is “the Creighton family of Omaha.”

In those early years, food staples and supplies were brought in by wagon from Yankton or West Point, being transported mainly during the winter so the rivers might be crossed while frozen. When the railroad arrived in 1881, insuring the existence of Creighton, it resulted in the near-demise of Bazile Mills to the north.

The next year Main Street was widened, additions were made to the original town, and formal incorporation papers were filed. Dr. George Roberts established a medical center that continued until 1920. After 33 years without a hospital, the Lundberg family and other concerned citizens built a modern hospital in 1953 that serves as the only hospital in Knox County. Many tales of bravery and human endurance arose from the catastrophic blizzard of 1888. More recently the winter of 1948–49, starting with a blizzard in November, brought a resignation to weather's importance in northeast Nebraska.

A newspaper started in 1889, the year a fire destroyed an entire block of the business district. This prompted the installation of a unique system that took water directly from Bazile Creek and stored it in a wooden tower to be used for fire protection. In 1894 a volunteer fire department was organized and today it still protects the city with one of the best-equipped units for its size. The first electric service was operated by Fred Largen and Andy Schneider in 1890. Later, Largen started making items such as motion picture projectors, irrigation sprinkler nozzles, and deep fryers. Creighton Bottling Works, also started making soda pop. In 1899 telephone service was installed by M.C. Theisen and Mr. Diehl. Northwestern Bell built long-distance lines from Norfolk.

Creighton became a second class city in 1907, the same year a two-story brick school was built in the south part of town. Domestic water was a problem until 1913, when a new water system was installed. A public library, built in 1914, was replaced in the 1960s by one donated by the Hengstler family. A municipal hall, built in 1916, is still in use for city offices and many public functions. With the war-to-end-all-wars over, the town experienced much growth. Electrical power was received from Interstate Power System in 1923. This system is now part of NPPD, with headquarters built in Creighton in 1960.

Bank and business failures were typical in the 1930s. The Bank of Creighton was one of the last in the county to close, and after reorganizing, it paid depositors nearly 100 percent.

Expansion followed as rural electrification became a reality, and new businesses and homes were built. The 1950s saw the end of passenger service on the Chicago & North Western Railway, but natural gas service became available. The city started a program to hard-surface the streets, and a modern swimming pool was built. In the 1960s school consolidation was successfully completed and a new high school was dedicated in 1962.

The town continued to grow, with its highest population, 1,461, registered in 1970. Expansion was needed in the water supply, hospital, and streets. An important milestone was Creighton's centennial, with a full week of celebration, parades, a pageant, and all kinds of entertainment for area residents. Since agriculture is the main industry, Creighton experiences fluctuations in its economy along with the rural area.

== Geography ==
According to the United States Census Bureau, the city has a total area of 1.21 square miles (3.13 km^{2}), all land.

== Demographics ==
Historical population
Census	Pop.	Note	%±
1880	10		—
1890	822		8,120.0%
1900	909		10.6%
1910	1,373		51.0%
1920	1,446		5.3%
1930	1,388		−4.0%
1940	1,272		−8.4%
1950	1,401		10.1%
1960	1,388		−0.9%
1970	1,461		5.3%
1980	1,341		−8.2%
1990	1,223		−8.8%
2000	1,270		3.8%
2010	1,154		−9.1%
2020	1,147		−0.6%
U.S. Decennial Census

=== 2010 census ===
At the 2010 census, there were 1,154 people, 538 households and 299 families living in the city. The population density was 953.7 inhabitants per square mile (368.2/km^{2}). There were 599 housing units at an average density of 495.0 per square mile (191.1/km^{2}). The racial makeup of the city was 97.1% White, 0.3% African American, 0.6% Native American, 0.3% Asian, 0.1% from other races, and 1.6% from two or more races. Hispanic or Latino of any race were 1.0% of the population.

There were 538 households, of which 23.8% had children under the age of 18 living with them, 43.7% were married couples living together, 8.0% had a female householder with no husband present, 3.9% had a male householder with no wife present, and 44.4% were non-families. 41.4% of all households were made up of individuals, and 25.7% had someone living alone who was 65 years of age or older. The average household size was 2.07 and the average family size was 2.83.

The median age was 47.7 years. 22.4% of residents were under the age of 18; 6% were between the ages of 18 and 24; 17.6% were from 25 to 44; 24% were from 45 to 64; and 30.2% were 65 years of age or older. The gender makeup was 44.9% male and 55.1% female.

=== 2000 census ===
At the 2000 census, there were 1,270 people, 559 households and 342 families living in the city. The population density was 1,079.8 inhabitants per square mile (416.9/km^{2}). There were 614 housing units at an average density of 522.0 per square mile (201.5/km^{2}). The racial makeup of the city was 98.11% White, 0.39% African American, 1.10% Native American, 0.08% Asian, 0.08% from other races, and 0.24% from two or more races. Hispanic or Latino of any race were 0.16% of the population.

There were 559 households, of which 24.9% had children under the age of 18 living with them, 53.5% were married couples living together, 5.7% had a female householder with no husband present, and 38.8% were non-families. 36.1% of all households were made up of individuals, and 22.2% had someone living alone who was 65 years of age or older. The average household size was 2.19 and the average family size was 2.87.

23.0% of the population were under the age of 18, 4.4% from 18 to 24, 21.3% from 25 to 44, 21.7% from 45 to 64, and 29.6% who were 65 years of age or older. The median age was 46 years. For every 100 females, there were 85.4 males. For every 100 females age 18 and over, there were 83.1 males.

The median household income was $27,763 and the median family income was $38,667. Males had a median income of $25,156 compared with $16,667 for females. The per capita income for the city was $15,293. About 7.4% of families and 10.1% of the population were below the poverty line, including 3.7% of those under age 18 and 13.1% of those age 65 or over.

== BerryPepper Days ==
BerryPepper Days are Creighton's annual celebration, held around the 3rd full weekend of June. Events for amature sports, music, and food are hosted throughout the celebration. BerryPeppers were originally Dr. Pepper and Strawberry soda mixed in paper cups and frozen. The recipe changed to in Dr. Pepper syrup and water.

== Notable people ==
- Joseph G. Hanefeldt - Roman Catholic bishop
- Tony Wragge - American football lineman

== Climate ==
This climatic region is typified by large seasonal temperature differences, with warm to hot (and often humid) summers and cold (sometimes severely cold) winters. According to the Köppen Climate Classification system, Creighton has a humid continental climate, abbreviated "Dfa" on climate maps.

Climate data for Creighton, Nebraska
Month	Jan	Feb	Mar	Apr	May	Jun	Jul	Aug	Sep	Oct	Nov	Dec	Year
Mean daily maximum °C (°F)	−1 (31)	2 (36)	9 (48)	17 (62)	23 (74)	29 (84)	31 (88)	30 (86)	26 (78)	18 (65)	8 (47)	1 (34)	16 (61)
Mean daily minimum °C (°F)	−13 (9)	−10 (14)	−4 (24)	2 (36)	9 (48)	14 (58)	17 (62)	16 (60)	11 (51)	3 (38)	−4 (25)	−10 (14)	3 (37)
Average precipitation mm (inches)	13 (0.5)	18 (0.7)	38 (1.5)	66 (2.6)	97 (3.8)	100 (4.1)	79 (3.1)	79 (3.1)	64 (2.5)	43 (1.7)	25 (1)	18 (0.7)	620 (24.4)
Source: Weatherbase
