= Knox County, Nebraska =

County in Nebraska, United States

- County
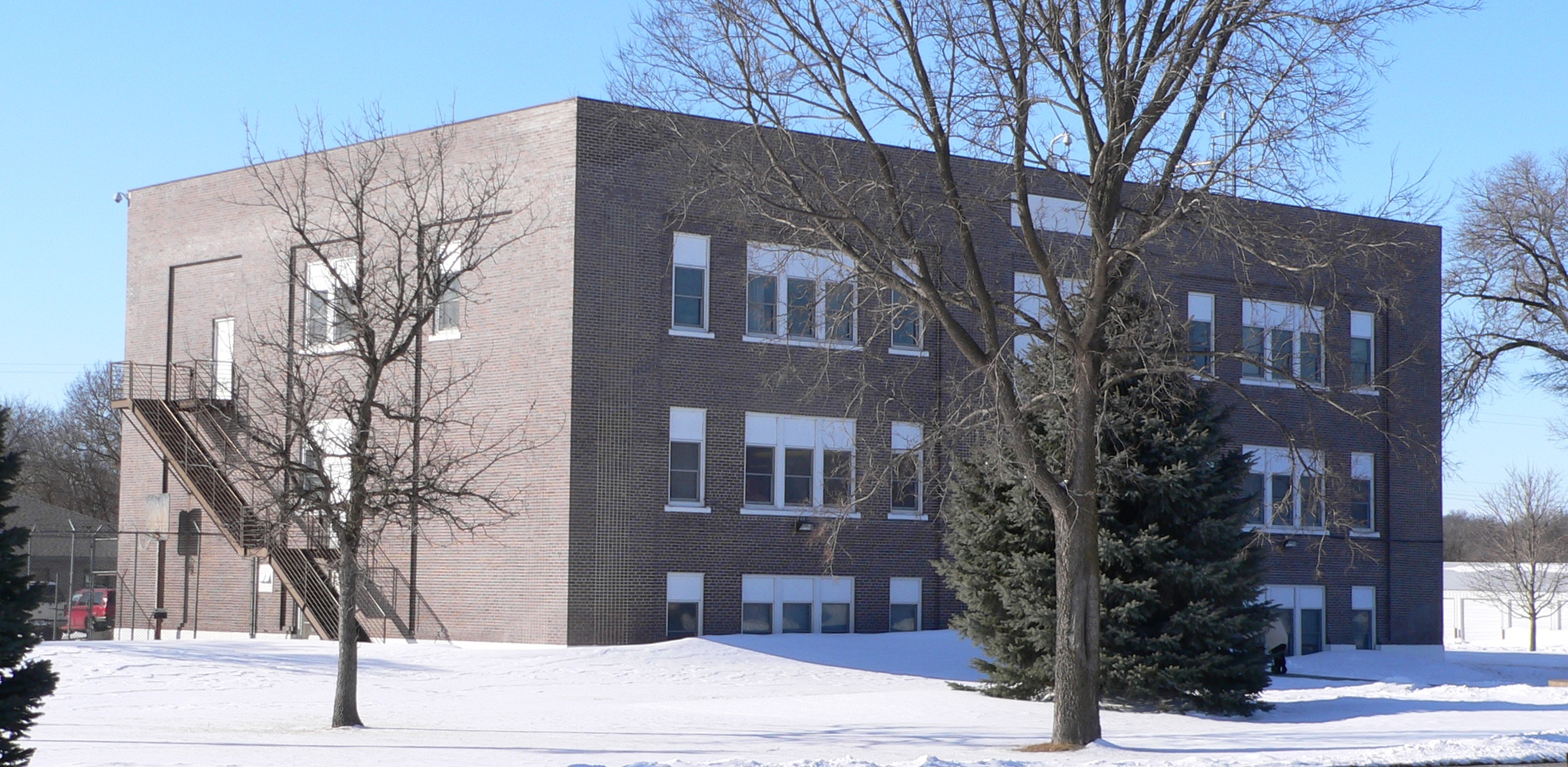
- Knox County Courthouse in Center

- Location within the U.S. state of Nebraska
- Coordinates: 42°38′N 97°53′W
- Country: United States
- State: Nebraska
- Founded: 1857
- Named for: Henry Knox
- Seat: Center
- Largest city: Creighton

Area
  - Total: 1,140 sq mi (3,000 km^{2})
  - Land: 1,108 sq mi (2,870 km^{2})
  - Water: 31 sq mi (80 km^{2}) 2.8%

Population (2020)
  - Total: 8,391
  - Estimate (2025): 8,335 ▼
  - Density: 7.573/sq mi (2.924/km^{2})
- Time zone: UTC−6 (Central)
  - Summer (DST): UTC−5 (CDT)
- Congressional district: 3rd
- Website: knoxcountyne.gov

Knox County is a county in the U.S. state of Nebraska. As of the 2020 United States census, the population was 8,391. Its county seat is Center. Knox County was named for Continental and U.S. Army Major General Henry Knox. In the Nebraska license plate system, Knox County is represented by the prefix 12 (it had the 12th-largest number of vehicles registered in the state when the license plate system was established in 1922).

== History ==
Knox County was organized by the Territorial Legislature in 1857, and named L'Eau Qui Court, that being the French name for the river named by the Ponca Niobrara—both names meaning, in English, Running Water. The name was changed to Knox by a statute passed February 21, 1873, which took effect April 1, 1873.

== Geography ==
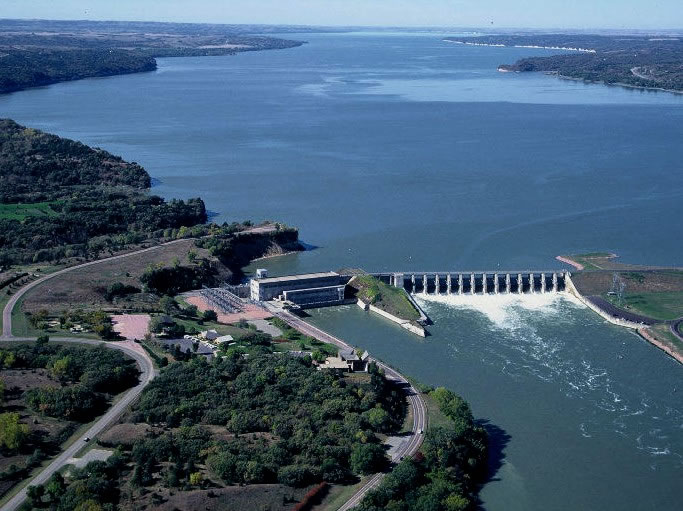
Lewis and Clark Lake, an impoundment on the Missouri River in the northeastern part of Knox County. Gavins Point Dam in the foreground.

Knox County lies along the north line of Nebraska. Its north boundary line abuts the south boundary line of the state of South Dakota. The terrain of the county consists of low rolling hills sloped to the northeast; most of the flat terrain is used for agriculture. The Missouri River flows eastward along the county's north boundary line. The Niobrara River enters the county's west boundary, flowing eastward then northward to drain into the Missouri River near the village of Niobrara. A smaller drainage, Verdigre Creek, flows northward into the county through the western central part of the county, draining into the Niobrara River shortly upstream of that river's mouth. The county has a total area of 1,140 square miles (3,000 km^{2}), of which 1,108 square miles (2,870 km^{2}) is land and 31 square miles (80 km^{2}) (2.8%) is water.

=== Major highways ===
- Nebraska Highway 12
- Nebraska Highway 13
- Nebraska Highway 14
- Nebraska Highway 59
- Nebraska Highway 84
- Nebraska Highway 121

=== Adjacent counties ===
- Bon Homme County, South Dakota - north
- Yankton County, South Dakota - northeast
- Cedar County - east
- Pierce County - southeast
- Antelope County - south
- Holt County - west
- Boyd County - northwest
- Charles Mix County, South Dakota - northwest

=== Protected areas ===
- Bazile Creek State Wildlife Management Area
- Bloomfield Recreation Area
- Deep Water Recreation Area
- Lewis and Clark Lake (part)
- Lewis and Clark State Recreation Area
- Miller Creek Recreation Area
- Missouri National Recreational River (part)
- Niobrara State Park
- South Shore Recreation Area

== Demographics ==
Historical population
Census	Pop.	Note	%±
1860	152		—
1870	261		71.7%
1880	3,666		1,304.6%
1890	8,582		134.1%
1900	14,343		67.1%
1910	18,358		28.0%
1920	18,894		2.9%
1930	19,110		1.1%
1940	16,478		−13.8%
1950	14,820		−10.1%
1960	13,300		−10.3%
1970	11,723		−11.9%
1980	11,457		−2.3%
1990	9,534		−16.8%
2000	9,374		−1.7%
2010	8,701		−7.2%
2020	8,391		−3.6%
2025 (est.)	8,335	▼	−0.7%
US Decennial Census; 1790-1960 1900-1990; 1990-2000 2010-2013 2020-2022

=== Racial and ethnic composition ===
Racial composition	2020	2010	2000
White	83.6%	87.2%	92.2%
Non-Hispanic		85.8%	91.3%
Native American	11.5%	10%	7.5%
Black or African American	0.2%	0.4%	0.1%
Hispanic or Latino (of any race)	2.2%	2.5%	0.9%
Asian	0.3%	0.5%	0.2%
Two or More Races	3.3%	1.8%	0.6%

=== 2020 census ===
As of the 2020 census, the county had a population of 8,391. The median age was 44.5 years. 24.5% of residents were under the age of 18 and 25.6% of residents were 65 years of age or older. For every 100 females there were 98.8 males, and for every 100 females age 18 and over there were 98.4 males age 18 and over.

The racial makeup of the county was 83.6% White, 0.2% Black or African American, 11.5% American Indian and Alaska Native, 0.3% Asian, 0.0% Native Hawaiian and Pacific Islander, 1.1% from some other race, and 3.3% from two or more races. Hispanic or Latino residents of any race comprised 2.2% of the population.

0.0% of residents lived in urban areas, while 100.0% lived in rural areas.

There were 3,435 households in the county, of which 26.4% had children under the age of 18 living with them and 22.3% had a female householder with no spouse or partner present. About 31.5% of all households were made up of individuals and 16.7% had someone living alone who was 65 years of age or older.

There were 4,502 housing units, of which 23.7% were vacant. Among occupied housing units, 75.4% were owner-occupied and 24.6% were renter-occupied. The homeowner vacancy rate was 1.9% and the rental vacancy rate was 10.4%.

=== 2010 census ===
As of the 2010 United States census, there were 8,701 people, 3,647 households, and 2,368 families in the county. The population density was 7.9 people per square mile (3.1 people/km^{2}). The racial makeup of the county was 87.2% White, 0.4% Black or African American, 10% Native American, 0.2% Asian, 0.0% Pacific Islander, and 1.8% from Two or More Races. 2.5% of the population were Hispanic or Latino of any race.

=== 2000 census ===
As of the 2000 United States census, there were 9,374 people, 3,811 households, and 2,595 families in the county. The population density was 8 people per square mile (3.1 people/km^{2}). There were 4,773 housing units at an average density of 4 units per square mile (1.5/km^{2}). The racial makeup of the county was 91.63% White, 0.09% Black or African American, 7.12% Native American, 0.16% Asian, 0.04% Pacific Islander, 0.34% from other races, and 0.63% from two or more races. 0.91% of the population were Hispanic or Latino of any race.

There were 3,811 households, out of which 29.30% had children under the age of 18 living with them, 59.00% were married couples living together, 6.00% had a female householder with no husband present, and 31.90% were non-families. 29.90% of all households were made up of individuals, and 17.40% had someone living alone who was 65 years of age or older. The average household size was 2.40 and the average family size was 2.98.

The county population contained 25.50% under the age of 18, 5.50% from 18 to 24, 21.90% from 25 to 44, 23.90% from 45 to 64, and 23.10% who were 65 years of age or older. The median age was 43 years. For every 100 females there were 96.70 males. For every 100 females age 18 and over, there were 95.20 males.

The median income for a household in the county was $27,564, and the median income for a family was $34,073. Males had a median income of $23,373 versus $18,319 for females. The per capita income for the county was $13,971. About 12.50% of families and 15.60% of the population were below the poverty line, including 20.40% of those under age 18 and 13.50% of those age 65 or over.

== Communities ==
=== Cities ===
- Bloomfield
- Creighton
- Crofton

=== Villages ===
- Bazile Mills
- Center (county seat)
- Niobrara
- Santee
- Verdel
- Verdigre
- Wausa
- Winnetoon

=== Census-designated place ===
- Lindy

=== Unincorporated communities ===
- Dukeville
- Jelen
- Knoxville
- Mars
- Pishelville
- Sparta
- Venus
- Walnut

=== Townships ===
- Addison
- Bohemia
- Central
- Cleveland
- Columbia
- Creighton
- Dolphin
- Dowling
- Eastern
- Frankfort
- Harrison
- Herrick
- Hill
- Jefferson
- Lincoln
- Logan
- Miller
- Morton
- Niobrara
- North Frankfort
- Peoria
- Raymond
- Spade
- Sparta
- Union
- Valley
- Verdigre
- Walnut Grove
- Washington
- Western

== Politics ==
Knox County voters are strongly Republican. In no national election since 1936 has the county selected the Democratic Party candidate.

United States presidential election results for Knox County, Nebraska
Year	Republican		Democratic		Third party(ies)	
Year	No.	%	No.	%	No.	%
1900	1,600	47.80%	1,630	48.70%	117	3.50%
1904	2,163	61.50%	864	24.57%	490	13.93%
1908	1,871	45.67%	2,106	51.40%	120	2.93%
1912	1,028	26.58%	1,803	46.61%	1,037	26.81%
1916	1,910	44.11%	2,329	53.79%	91	2.10%
1920	3,678	69.87%	1,470	27.93%	116	2.20%
1924	2,405	38.63%	1,532	24.61%	2,289	36.77%
1928	3,668	55.46%	2,914	44.06%	32	0.48%
1932	1,830	25.67%	5,229	73.36%	69	0.97%
1936	2,949	38.89%	4,449	58.67%	185	2.44%
1940	4,352	57.79%	3,179	42.21%	0	0.00%
1944	3,762	60.20%	2,487	39.80%	0	0.00%
1948	2,778	51.68%	2,597	48.32%	0	0.00%
1952	4,840	75.47%	1,573	24.53%	0	0.00%
1956	3,814	64.38%	2,110	35.62%	0	0.00%
1960	3,847	64.45%	2,122	35.55%	0	0.00%
1964	2,752	51.26%	2,617	48.74%	0	0.00%
1968	3,129	68.20%	1,131	24.65%	328	7.15%
1972	3,318	72.02%	1,289	27.98%	0	0.00%
1976	2,610	56.08%	1,922	41.30%	122	2.62%
1980	3,404	71.08%	1,057	22.07%	328	6.85%
1984	3,364	73.77%	1,149	25.20%	47	1.03%
1988	2,644	63.76%	1,477	35.62%	26	0.63%
1992	2,113	49.55%	968	22.70%	1,183	27.74%
1996	2,123	53.91%	1,266	32.15%	549	13.94%
2000	2,784	69.98%	1,037	26.07%	157	3.95%
2004	3,062	72.68%	1,086	25.78%	65	1.54%
2008	2,728	66.80%	1,255	30.73%	101	2.47%
2012	2,885	71.48%	1,059	26.24%	92	2.28%
2016	3,188	77.47%	720	17.50%	207	5.03%
2020	3,721	79.04%	905	19.22%	82	1.74%
2024	3,593	80.78%	786	17.67%	69	1.55%

== See also ==
- National Register of Historic Places listings in Knox County, Nebraska
