= Nebraska Outback =

North-central region of Nebraska, US

Coordinates: 42°30′N 99°30′W

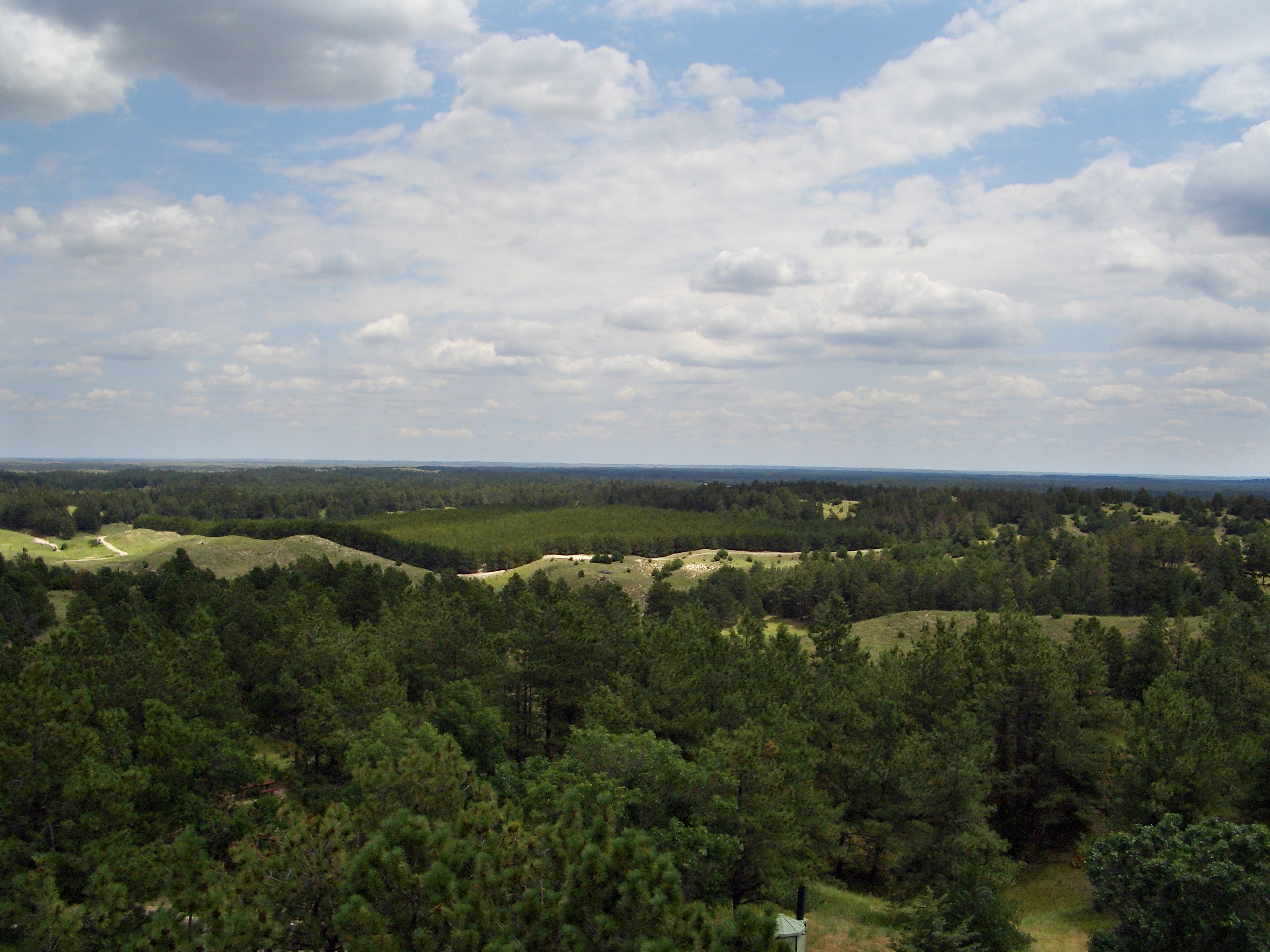
Nebraska National Forest in the Nebraska Outback.

The Nebraska Outback is the north-central region of the U.S. state of Nebraska. It comprises Boyd, Holt, Rock, Blaine, Brown, Keya Paha and Cherry counties.

== About ==
Calling this region the "Nebraska Outback" is part of a tourism campaign led by a nonprofit organization called the North Central Nebraska RC & D Council. It is sponsored by six counties, five Natural Resource Districts, 29 local communities and three local Chambers of Commerce.

The North Central Nebraska RC&D Council partners with communities, organizations and agencies to assist the local people in the development of their communities, counties and region. The Outback is bordered by South Dakota on the north, and a small section of the Missouri River runs at the region’s eastern edge. The area has a population of 26,984 people on 12,627 square miles (32,700 km^{2}) of land, or 2.1 people per square mile.

The outback is connected with the rest of Nebraska by way of four Nebraska byways: Bridges to Buttes Byway (Highway 20), the Outlaw Trail (Highway 12) and small sections of the Loup Rivers Scenic Byway (Highways 91/11), and the Sandhills Journey (Highway 2) in Blaine County. The Cowboy Trail is a bicycling, walking and equestrian trail that will eventually cross 321 miles (517 km) east-west from Norfolk to Chadron.

== Visitor attractions ==
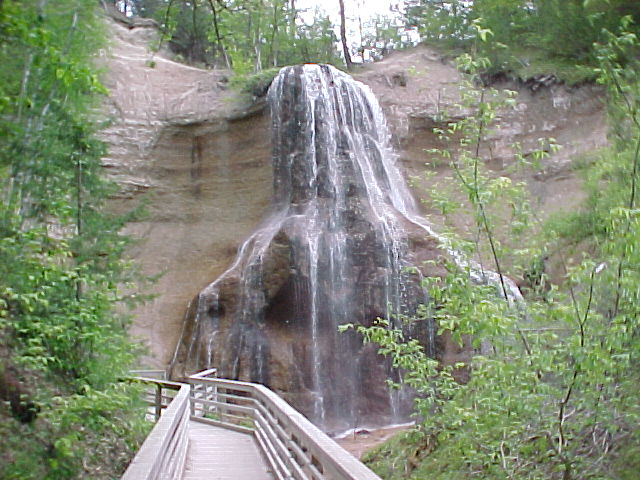
Smith Falls near Valentine.

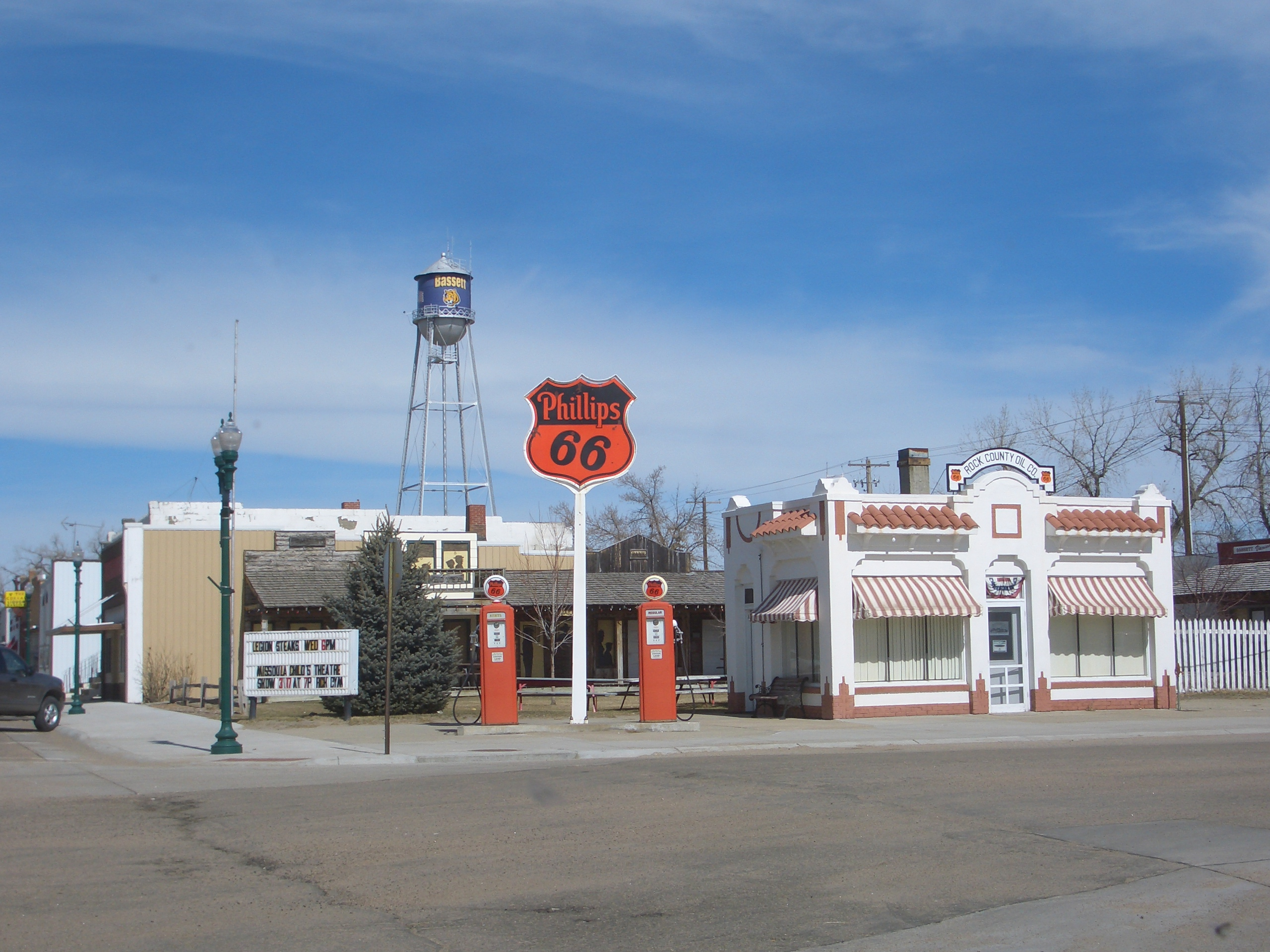
Restored Phillips 66 station in Bassett.

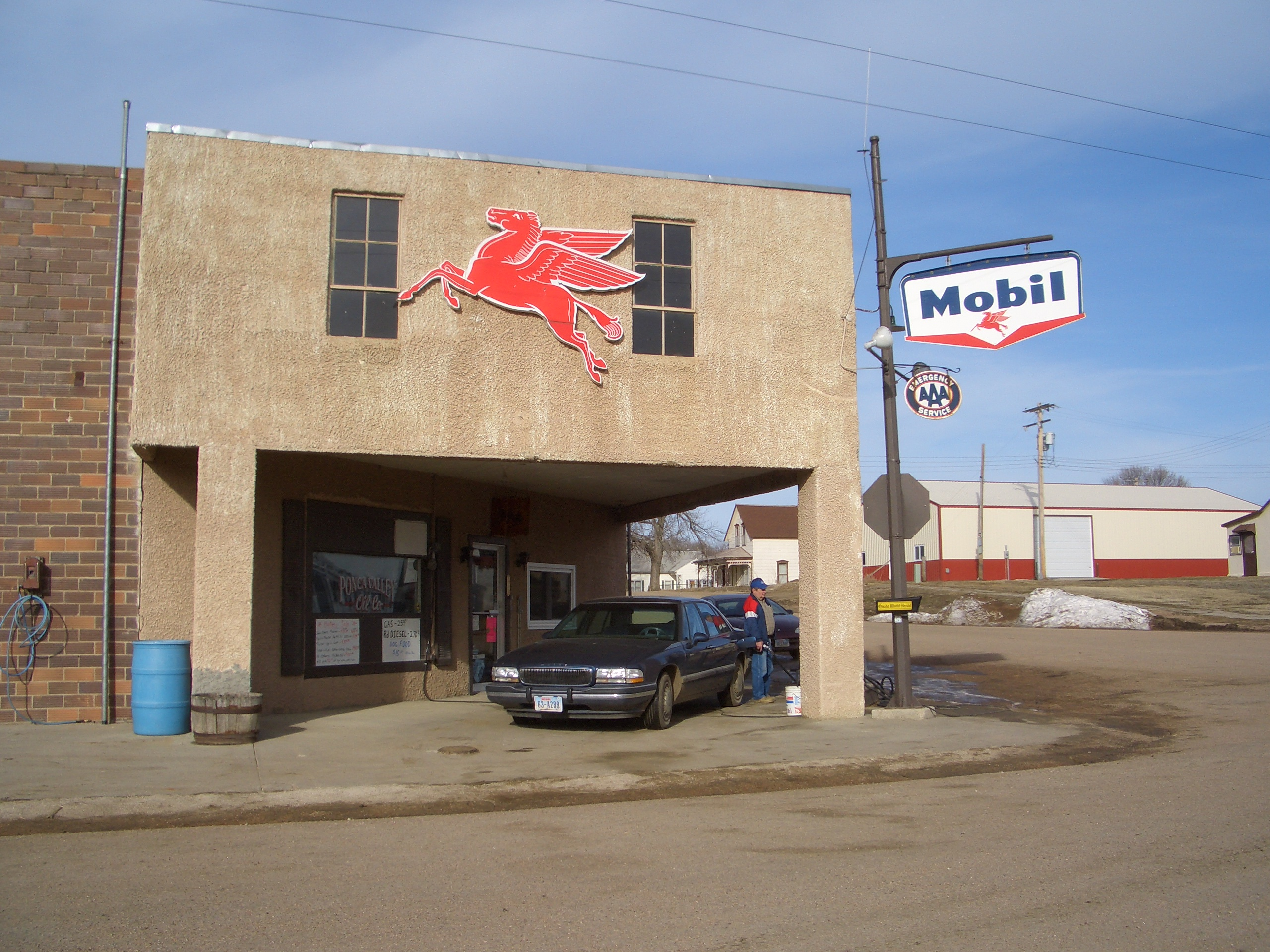
Mobil station in Lynch.

Particular attractions in the area have been identified in order to promote tourism throughout the Outback.

Visitor attractions in the Nebraska Outback
Name	Location	Notes
Arthur Bowring Sandhills Ranch State Historical Park	Merriman	
Samuel R. McKelvie National Forest	Nenzel	
Spade Ranch	Ellsworth	Listed on the National Register of Historic Places
Merritt Reservoir	Valentine	
Snake Falls	Valentine	
Smith Falls State Park	Valentine	
Downtown Valentine	Valentine	
Valentine Fish Hatchery	Valentine	
Fort Niobrara National Wildlife Refuge	Valentine	
Lovejoy Ranch Bed and Breakfast	Valentine	
Turtle Butte Lodge	Springview	
Uncle Buck’s Lodge	Brewster	
Sandhills Guest Ranch Bed & Breakfast	Brewster	
Norden Dance Hall	Ord	
Keya Paha County Fairgrounds	Springview	
Brown County Fairgrounds	Ainsworth	
Niobrara River Road	Norden	
Meadville		Ghost town
Winnetoon		Replicas of early storefronts, schoolhouse, trading post, prairie grass gardens, log cabin and historic city jail. The town "mall" includes a working 1890s post office, antiques, carvings and natural foods store.
Sunshine Bottom	Lynch	Settled by German emigrants from the Russian Empire, Sunshine Bottom features settlement patterns and homes similar to those the emigrants left behind in Ukraine.
Sturdevant-McKee House Museum	Atkinson	
Something Special by Marilyn	Atkinson	
White Horse Museum	Stuart	
Rock County Oil Company Phillips 66	Bassett	Constructed in 1927 in the Spanish Revival style
Cowboy Trail	Norfolk to Chadron	
Happy Hollow Cabins		
Outlaw Trail Scenic Byway	South Sioux City to Valentine	
Old Baldy	Lynch	Listed on the National Register of Historic Places
Butte Historical Center	Butte	
Spencer Museum Village	Spencer	
Strawbale Saloon	Spencer	
Brown County Historical Society & Coleman House Museum	Ainsworth	
Holt County Historical Society Museum	O'Neill	
Long Pine Heritage Society & Heritage House Museum	Long Pine	link
Sellor's Log Cabin	Ainsworth	
White Horse Ranch Museum	Stuart	link
Rock County Historical Museum		

== See also ==
- History of Nebraska
- Historic houses in Nebraska
- Landmarks of the Nebraska Territory
