= Red Otter Creek =

Stream in Nebraska, USA

Red Otter Creek Tributary to Niobrara River
- Location of Red Otter Creek mouth Red Otter Creek (the United States)

Location
- Country: United States
- State: Nebraska
- County: Knox; Holt

Physical characteristics
- Source: North Branch Verdigre Creek and East Branch Louse Creek divides
  - location: about 8 miles north of Star, Nebraska
  - coordinates: 42°38′57.00″N 098°24′10.29″W
  - elevation: 1,880 ft (570 m)
- Mouth: Niobrara River
  - location: about 4 miles northwest of Pishelville, Nebraska
  - coordinates: 42°45′36.00″N 098°18′8.29″W
  - elevation: 1,345 ft (410 m)
- Length: 13.09 mi (21.07 km)
- Basin size: 10.44 square miles (27.0 km^{2})
- Discharge
  - location: Niobrara River
  - average: 1.96 cu ft/s (0.056 m^{3}/s) at mouth with Niobrara River

Basin features
- Progression: Niobrara River → Missouri River → Mississippi River → Gulf of Mexico
- River system: Niobrara
- Bridges: 887th Road, 888th Road, 891st Road

Red Otter Creek is a 13.09 mi (21.07 km) long 2nd order tributary to the Niobrara River in Knox County, Nebraska. This is the only stream of this name in the United States.

== Variant names ==
According to the Geographic Names Information System, it has also been known historically as:

- Squaw Creek

== Course ==
Red Otter Creek rises on the North Branch Verdigre Creek and East Branch Louse Creek divides about 8 miles north of Star, Nebraska in Holt County and then flows generally northeast into Knox County and to join the Niobrara River about 4 miles northwest of Pishelville, Nebraska.

== Watershed ==
Red Otter Creek drains 10.44 square miles (27.0 km^{2}) of area, receives about 24.8 in/year of precipitation, has a wetness index of 518.81, and is about 3.19% forested.

== See also ==
- List of rivers of Nebraska
