= Soldier Creek (Niobrara River tributary) =

Stream in Nebraska, USA

Soldier Creek Tributary to Niobrara River
- Location of Soldier Creek mouth Soldier Creek (Niobrara River tributary) (the United States)

Location
- Country: United States
- State: Nebraska
- County: Knox

Physical characteristics
- Source: North Branch Verdigre Creek divide
  - location: about 4 miles southeast of Knoxville, Nebraska
  - coordinates: 42°38′6.00″N 098°12′48.00″W
  - elevation: 1,698 ft (518 m)
- Mouth: Niobrara River
  - location: about 3 miles southeast of Pishelville, Nebraska
  - coordinates: 42°42′46.00″N 098°09′59.27″W
  - elevation: 1,293 ft (394 m)
- Length: 8.57 mi (13.79 km)
- Basin size: 12.83 square miles (33.2 km^{2})
- Discharge
  - location: Niobrara River
  - average: 1.59 cu ft/s (0.045 m^{3}/s) at mouth with Niobrara River

Basin features
- Progression: Niobrara River → Missouri River → Mississippi River → Gulf of Mexico
- River system: Niobrara
- Waterbodies: Vonasek Reservoir
- Bridges: 884th Road, 885 Road, 516th Avenue

Soldier Creek is a 8.57 mi (13.79 km) long second-order tributary to the Niobrara River in Knox County, Nebraska.

== Course ==
Soldier Creek rises on the North Branch Verdigre Creek divide about 4 miles southeast of Knoxville, Nebraska and then flows northeast to join the Niobrara River about 3 miles southeast of Pishelville, Nebraska.

== Watershed ==
Soldier Creek drains 12.83 square miles (33.2 km^{2}) of area, receives about 24.8 in/year of precipitation, has a wetness index of 463.77, and is about 6.36% forested.

== See also ==
- List of rivers of Nebraska
