= Pishel Creek =

Stream in Nebraska, USA

Pishel Creek Tributary to Niobrara River
- Location of Pishel Creek mouth Pishel Creek (the United States)

Location
- Country: United States
- State: Nebraska
- County: Knox; Holt

Physical characteristics
- Source: North Branch Verdigre Creek divide
  - location: about 2.5 miles south-southwest of Knoxville, Nebraska
  - coordinates: 42°38′6.00″N 098°12′48.00″W
  - elevation: 1,840 ft (560 m)
- Mouth: Niobrara River
  - location: about Pishelville, Nebraska
  - coordinates: 42°42′46.00″N 098°09′59.27″W
  - elevation: 1,312 ft (400 m)
- Length: 11.50 mi (18.51 km)
- Basin size: 20.36 square miles (52.7 km^{2})
- Discharge
  - location: Niobrara River
  - average: 2.40 cu ft/s (0.068 m^{3}/s) at mouth with Niobrara River

Basin features
- Progression: Niobrara River → Missouri River → Mississippi River → Gulf of Mexico
- River system: Niobrara
- Waterbodies: Bartos Reservoir,
- Bridges: 886 Road, 887 Road, 512th Road, 890th Road, 891 Road

Pishel Creek is a 11.50 mi (18.51 km) long 2nd order tributary to the Niobrara River in Knox County, Nebraska. This is the only stream of this name in the United States.

== Course ==
Pishel Creek rises on the North Branch Verdigre Creek divide about 2.5 miles Knoxville, Nebraska in Knox County and then flows north straddling the Knox-Holt County line and then turns northeast to join the Niobrara River at Pishelville, Nebraska.

== Watershed ==
Pishel Creek drains 20.36 square miles (52.7 km^{2}) of area, receives about 24.02 in/year of precipitation, has a wetness index of 454.61, and is about 5.42% forested.

== See also ==
- List of rivers of Nebraska
