= Elk Creek (Niobrara River tributary) =

Stream in Nebraska, U.S.

Elk Creek Tributary to Niobrara River
- Location of Elk Creek mouth Elk Creek (Niobrara River tributary) (the United States)

Location
- Country: United States
- State: Nebraska
- County: Rock

Physical characteristics
- Source: North Fork Elkhorn River divide
  - location: about 0.5 miles east-northeast of School No. 62
  - coordinates: 42°39′26.00″N 099°33′46.00″W
  - elevation: 2,268 ft (691 m)
- Mouth: Niobrara River
  - location: about 0.5 miles southeast of Riverview, Nebraska
  - coordinates: 42°43′23.00″N 099°34′38.41″W
  - elevation: 1,906 ft (581 m)
- Length: 5.61 mi (9.03 km)
- Basin size: 11.09 square miles (28.7 km^{2})
- Discharge
  - location: Niobrara River
  - average: 1.34 cu ft/s (0.038 m^{3}/s) at mouth with Niobrara River

Basin features
- Progression: Niobrara River → Missouri River → Mississippi
- River system: Niobrara
- Bridges: none

Elk Creek is a 5.61 mi (9.03 km) long first-order tributary to the Niobrara River in Rock County, Nebraska.

Elk Creek rises on the divide of North Fork Elkhorn River and then flows generally north to join the Niobrara River about 0.5 miles (0.80 km) southeast of Riverview, Nebraska.

== Watershed ==
Elk Creek drains 11.09 square miles (28.7 km^{2}) of area, receives about 23.6 in/year (60 cm/year) of precipitation, and is about 3.32% forested.

== See also ==
- List of rivers of Nebraska
