= Snake River (Nebraska) =

River in Nebraska, U.S.

Coordinates: 42°46′46″N 100°47′33″W

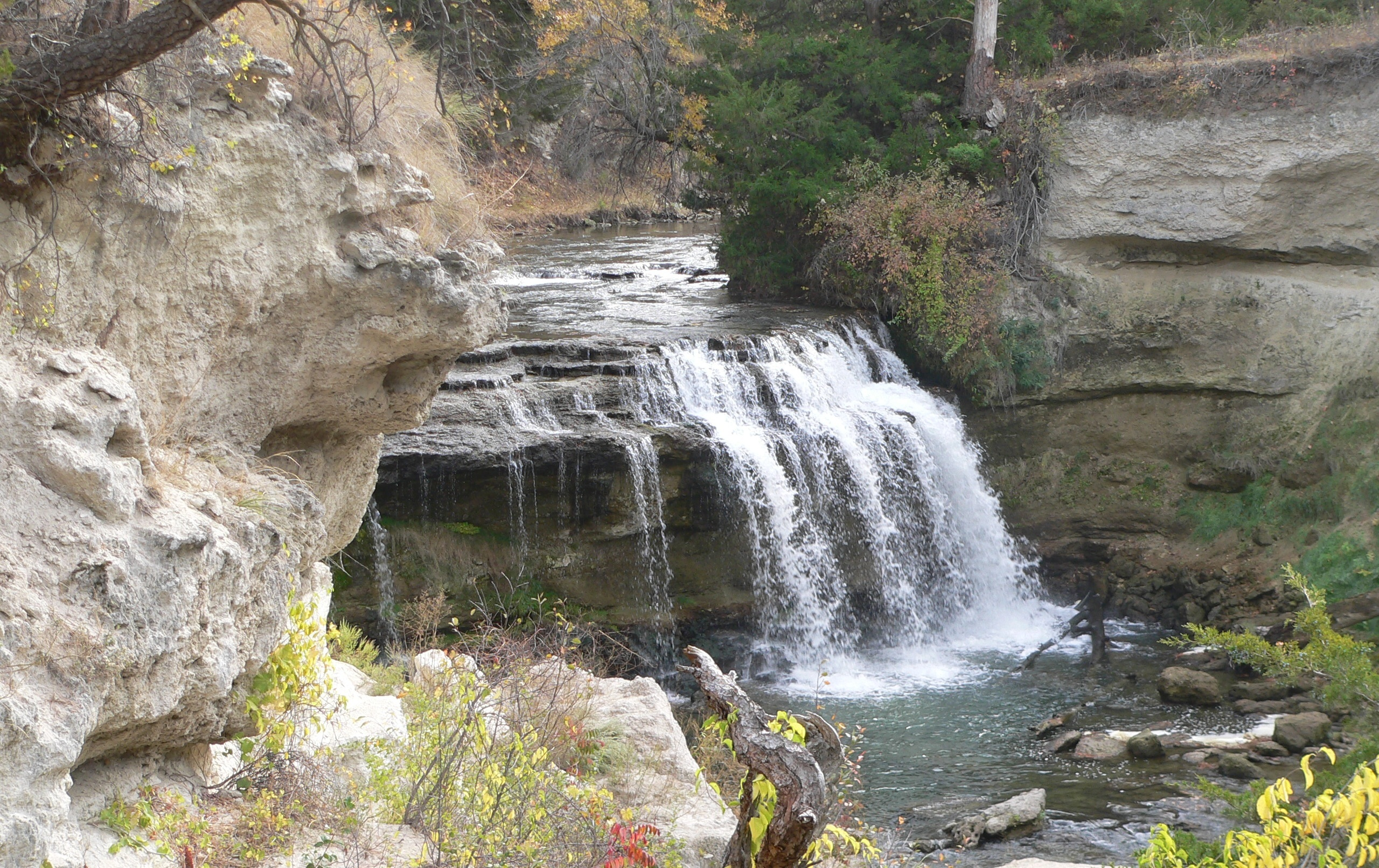
Snake River Falls

The Snake River is a 126-mile-long (203 km) tributary of the Niobrara River. Entirely located within the Sandhills of north-central Nebraska, the Snake River rises near the eastern edge of Sheridan County. It flows eastward into Cherry County and passes along the southern edge of Samuel R. McKelvie National Forest. On the southeast edge of the national forest, the river is dammed to form Merritt Reservoir. At this point, the river makes a sharp turn to the north. At Burge, the river has a mean annual discharge of 158 cubic feet per second (4.5 cubic metres per second).

Snake River Falls is immediately to the north of Merritt Reservoir; it is the largest waterfall, as measured by volume, in the state. (Nebraska's highest waterfall is Smith Falls.) The Snake River joins the Niobrara River about 15 miles (24 km) southwest of Valentine, Nebraska.

== See also ==
- List of Nebraska rivers
