= Ash Creek (Niobrara River tributary) =

Stream in Nebraska, U.S.

Ash Creek Tributary to Niobrara River
- Location of Ash Creek mouth Ash Creek (Niobrara River tributary) (the United States)

Location
- Country: United States
- State: Nebraska
- County: Holt; Rock

Physical characteristics
- Source: North Fork Elkhorn River divide
  - location: about 0.5 miles southwest of School No. 172
  - coordinates: 42°39′39.06″N 099°14′1.37″W
  - elevation: 2,175 ft (663 m)
- Mouth: Niobrara River
  - location: about 0.25 miles northeast of Mariaville, Nebraska
  - coordinates: 42°46′55.00″N 099°19′43.38″W
  - elevation: 1,801 ft (549 m)
- Length: 11.17 mi (17.98 km)
- Basin size: 49.05 square miles (127.0 km^{2})
- Discharge
  - location: Niobrara River
  - average: 4.88 cu ft/s (0.138 m^{3}/s) at mouth with Niobrara River

Basin features
- Progression: Niobrara River → Missouri River → Mississippi
- River system: Niobrara
- Bridges: 461st Avenue, 889th Road, Agate Avenue, Augusta Road

Ash Creek is a 11.17 mi (17.98 km) long second-order tributary to the Niobrara River in Rock County, Nebraska.

== Course ==
Ash Creek rises on the North Fork Elkhorn River divide about 0.5 miles (0.80 km) southwest of School No. 172 in Holt County and then flows northwest into Rock County to join the Niobrara River about 0.25 miles (0.40 km) northeast of Mariaville, Nebraska.

== Watershed ==
Ash Creek drains 49.05 square miles (127.0 km^{2}) of area, receives about 24.4 in/year (62 cm/year) of precipitation, and is about 2.60% forested.

== See also ==
- List of rivers of Nebraska
