= Burgess Creek (Niobrara River tributary) =

Stream in Nebraska, USA

Burgess Creek Tributary to Niobrara River
- Location of Burgess Creek mouth Burgess Creek (Niobrara River tributary) (the United States)

Location
- Country: United States
- State: Nebraska
- County: Knox

Physical characteristics
- Source: Sand Creek divide
  - location: about 3 miles north-northeast of Sparta, Nebraska
  - coordinates: 42°40′50.01″N 097°57′52.26″W
  - elevation: 1,670 ft (510 m)
- Mouth: Niobrara River
  - location: about 1 southwest of Niobrara, Nebraska
  - coordinates: 42°44′26.00″N 098°02′57.26″W
  - elevation: 1,224 ft (373 m)
- Length: 8.49 mi (13.66 km)
- Basin size: 9.93 square miles (25.7 km^{2})
- Discharge
  - location: Niobrara River
  - average: 1.22 cu ft/s (0.035 m^{3}/s) at mouth with Niobrara River

Basin features
- Progression: Niobrara River → Missouri River → Mississippi River → Gulf of Mexico
- River system: Niobrara
- Bridges: 887 Road, 527 Avenue, 516 Avenue, 525 Avenue, NE 14

Burgess Creek is a 8.49 mi (13.66 km) long second-order tributary to the Niobrara River in Knox County, Nebraska.

== Course ==
Burgess Creek rises on the Sand Creek divide about 3 miles north-northeast of Sparta, Nebraska and then flows northwest to join the Niobrara River about 1 mile southwest of Niobrara, Nebraska.

== Watershed ==
Burgess Creek drains 9.93 square miles (25.7 km^{2}) of area, receives about 23.9 in/year of precipitation, has a wetness index of 393.06, and is about 3.91% forested.

== See also ==
- List of rivers of Nebraska
