= Bingham Creek (Niobrara River tributary) =

Stream in Nebraska, USA

Bingham Creek Tributary to Niobrara River
- Location of Bingham Creek mouth Bingham Creek (Niobrara River tributary) (the United States)

Location
- Country: United States
- State: Nebraska
- County: Knox

Physical characteristics
- Source: Bazile Creek divide
  - location: about 1 mile south-southwest of Sparta, Nebraska
  - coordinates: 42°38′24.01″N 097°58′28.25″W
  - elevation: 1,675 ft (511 m)
- Mouth: Niobrara River
  - location: about 1 southeast of Ponca, Nebraska
  - coordinates: 42°42′14.00″N 098°03′0.26″W
  - elevation: 1,260 ft (380 m)
- Length: 7.95 mi (12.79 km)
- Basin size: 6.95 square miles (18.0 km^{2})
- Discharge
  - location: Niobrara River
  - average: 0.90 cu ft/s (0.025 m^{3}/s) at mouth with Niobrara River

Basin features
- Progression: Niobrara River → Missouri River → Mississippi River → Gulf of Mexico
- River system: Niobrara
- Bridges: 885 Road, 888th Road, 525 Avenue, NE 14

Bingham Creek is a 7.95 mi (12.79 km) long 2nd order tributary to the Niobrara River in Knox County, Nebraska.

== Course ==
Bingham Creek rises on the Bazile Creek divide about 1 mile south-southwest of Sparta, Nebraska and then flows generally northwest to join the Niobrara River about 1 mile southeast of Ponca, Nebraska.

== Watershed ==
Bingham Creek drains 6.95 square miles (18.0 km^{2}) of area, receives about 24.5 in/year of precipitation, has a wetness index of 369.59, and is about 6.24% forested.

== See also ==
- List of rivers of Nebraska
