= Schindler Creek (Niobrara River tributary) =

Stream in Nebraska, USA

Schindler Creek Tributary to Niobrara River
- Location of Schindler Creek mouth Schindler Creek (Niobrara River tributary) (the United States)

Location
- Country: United States
- State: Nebraska
- County: Knox

Physical characteristics
- Source: North Branch Verdigre Creek divide
  - location: about 5 miles northwest of Verdigre, Nebraska
  - coordinates: 42°37′16.01″N 098°06′15.26″W
  - elevation: 1,660 ft (510 m)
- Mouth: Niobrara River
  - location: about 2 miles southeast of Ponca, Nebraska
  - coordinates: 42°40′50.00″N 098°06′15.26″W
  - elevation: 1,280 ft (390 m)
- Length: 7.04 mi (11.33 km)
- Basin size: 10.50 square miles (27.2 km^{2})
- Discharge
  - location: Niobrara River
  - average: 1.34 cu ft/s (0.038 m^{3}/s) at mouth with Niobrara River

Basin features
- Progression: Niobrara River → Missouri River → Mississippi River → Gulf of Mexico
- River system: Niobrara
- Bridges: 519 Avenue, 886 Road

Schindler Creek is a 7.04 mi (11.33 km) long second-order tributary to the Niobrara River in Knox County, Nebraska.

== Course ==
Schindler Creek rises on the North Branch Verdigre Creek divide about 5 miles northwest of Verdigre, Nebraska and then flows generally northeast to join the Niobrara River about 2 miles southwest of Ponca, Nebraska.

== Watershed ==
Schindler Creek drains 10.50 square miles (27.2 km^{2}) of area, receives about 24.7 in/year of precipitation, has a wetness index of 444.27, and is about 10.44% forested.

== See also ==
- List of rivers of Nebraska
