= Little Sandy Creek =

Little Sandy Creek may refer to the following waterways:

- Little Sandy Creek, a tributary of Sandy Creek (Michigan)
- Little Sandy Creek (Niobrara River tributary), a stream in Holt County, Nebraska
- Little Sandy Creek (Big Sandy Creek), Pennsylvania
- Little Sandy Creek (Redbank Creek), Pennsylvania
- Little Sandy Creek (Sandy Creek), Pennsylvania
