= Dutch Creek (Niobrara River tributary) =

Stream in Nebraska, U.S.

Dutch Creek Tributary to Niobrara River
- Location of Dutch Creek mouth Dutch Creek (Niobrara River tributary) (the United States)

Location
- Country: United States
- State: Nebraska
- County: Brown

Physical characteristics
- Source: Sand Draw divide
  - location: about 1-mile northwest of Park Row School
  - coordinates: 42°41′56.00″N 099°49′46.00″W
  - elevation: 2,338 ft (713 m)
- Mouth: Niobrara River
  - location: about 8 miles southeast of Meadville, Nebraska
  - coordinates: 42°44′18.00″N 099°47′36.47″W
  - elevation: 2,005 ft (611 m)
- Length: 4.06 mi (6.53 km)
- Basin size: 11.23 square miles (29.1 km^{2})
- Discharge
  - location: Niobrara River
  - average: 1.35 cu ft/s (0.038 m^{3}/s) at mouth with Niobrara River

Basin features
- Progression: Niobrara River → Missouri River → Mississippi River → Gulf of Mexico
- River system: Niobrara
- Tributaries
  - right: Devils Gulch
- Bridges: none

Dutch Creek is a 4.06 mi (6.53 km) long second-order tributary to the Niobrara River in Brown County, Nebraska.

== Course ==
Dutch Creek rises on the divide of Sand Draw in the Nebraska Sandhills about 1 mile (1.6 km) northwest of Park Row School and then flows generally northeast to join the Niobrara River about 8 miles (13 km) southeast of Meadville, Nebraska.

== Watershed ==
Dutch Creek drains 11.23 square miles (29.1 km^{2}) of area, receives about 22.7 in/year (58 cm/year) of precipitation, and is about 13.09% forested.

== See also ==
- List of rivers of Nebraska
