= Wyman Creek (Niobrara River tributary) =

Stream in Nebraska, U.S.

Wyman Creek Tributary to Niobrara River
- Location of Wyman Creek mouth Wyman Creek (Niobrara River tributary) (the United States)

Location
- Country: United States
- State: Nebraska
- County: Keya Paha

Physical characteristics
- Source: Burton Creek divide
  - location: about 3 miles west-northwest of Gipson Landing Strip
  - coordinates: 42°48′16.00″N 099°37′53.41″W
  - elevation: 2,400 ft (730 m)
- Mouth: Niobrara River
  - location: about 0.25 miles southeast of Riverview, Nebraska
  - coordinates: 42°43′31.00″N 099°34′46.41″W
  - elevation: 1,910 ft (580 m)
- Length: 7.82 mi (12.59 km)
- Basin size: 12.52 square miles (32.4 km^{2})
- Discharge
  - location: Niobrara River
  - average: 1.50 cu ft/s (0.042 m^{3}/s) at mouth with Niobrara River

Basin features
- Progression: Niobrara River → Missouri River → Mississippi
- River system: Niobrara
- Bridges: Riverview Road

Wyman Creek is a 7.82 mi (12.59 km) long third-order tributary to the Niobrara River in Keya Paha County, Nebraska.

Wyman Creek rises on the divide of Burton Creek and then flows generally south to join the Niobrara River about 0.25 miles (0.40 km) southeast of Riverview, Nebraska.

== Watershed ==
Wyman Creek drains 12.51 square miles (32.4 km^{2}) of area, receives about 22.9 in/year (58 cm/year) of precipitation, and is about 39.12% forested.

== See also ==
- List of rivers of Nebraska
