= Oak Creek (Niobrara River tributary) =

Stream in Nebraska, U.S.

Oak Creek Tributary to Niobrara River
- Location of Oak Creek mouth Oak Creek (Niobrara River tributary) (the United States)

Location
- Country: United States
- State: Nebraska
- County: Rock

Physical characteristics
- Source: North Fork Elkhorn River divide
  - location: about 0.25 miles north of Plainview School
  - coordinates: 42°41′8.00″N 099°19′27.38″W
  - elevation: 2,205 ft (672 m)
- Mouth: Niobrara River
  - location: about 1.5 miles west of Mariaville, Nebraska
  - coordinates: 42°46′39.00″N 099°20′41.38″W
  - elevation: 1,805 ft (550 m)
- Length: 7.41 mi (11.93 km)
- Basin size: 14.86 square miles (38.5 km^{2})
- Discharge
  - location: Niobrara River
  - average: 1.81 cu ft/s (0.051 m^{3}/s) at mouth with Niobrara River

Basin features
- Progression: Niobrara River → Missouri River → Mississippi
- River system: Niobrara
- Bridges: NE 137, 888th Road, NE 137, 890th Road, Antelope Road

Oak Creek is a 7.41 mi (11.93 km) long third-order tributary to the Niobrara River in Rock County, Nebraska.

Oak Creek rises on the North Fork Elkhorn River divide about 0.25 miles (0.40 km) north of Plainview School and then flows northwest and northeast to join the Niobrara River about 1.5 miles (2.4 km) west of Mariaville, Nebraska.

== Watershed ==
Oak Creek drains 14.86 square miles (38.5 km^{2}) of area, receives about 24.2 in/year (61 cm/year) of precipitation, and is about 9.33% forested.

== See also ==
- List of rivers of Nebraska
