= Coon Creek (Nebraska) =

Stream in Nebraska, U.S.

Coordinates: 40.0580592°N 97.0619763°W

Coon Creek is a stream in Jefferson County, Nebraska, in the United States.

Coon Creek was named from the abundance of raccoons living in the nearby trees.

== See also ==
- List of rivers of Nebraska
