= List of rivers of Nebraska =

This is a partial list of rivers in Nebraska (U.S. state).

== By tributary ==
=== Missouri River ===
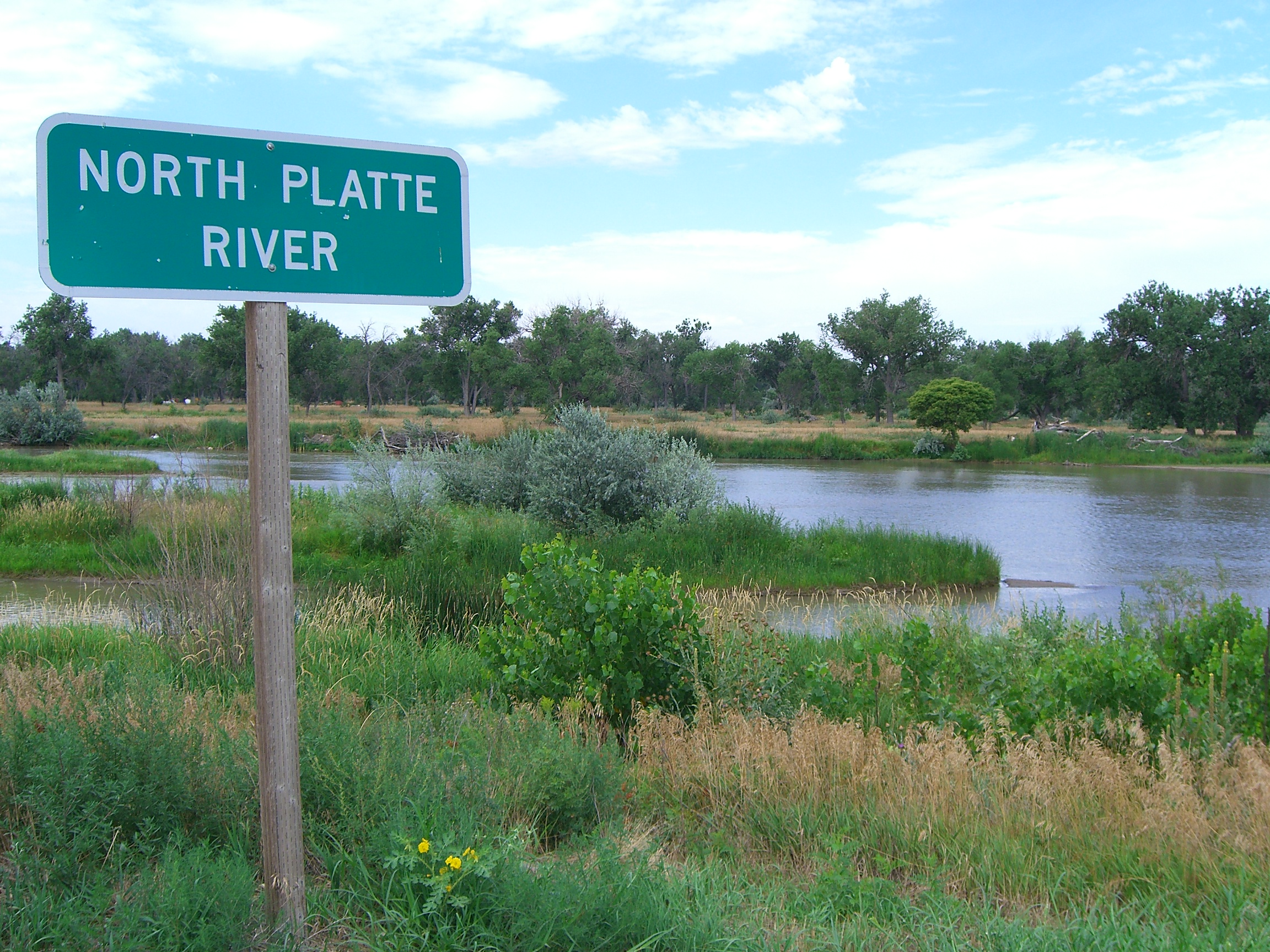
North Platte River in Bridgeport, Nebraska

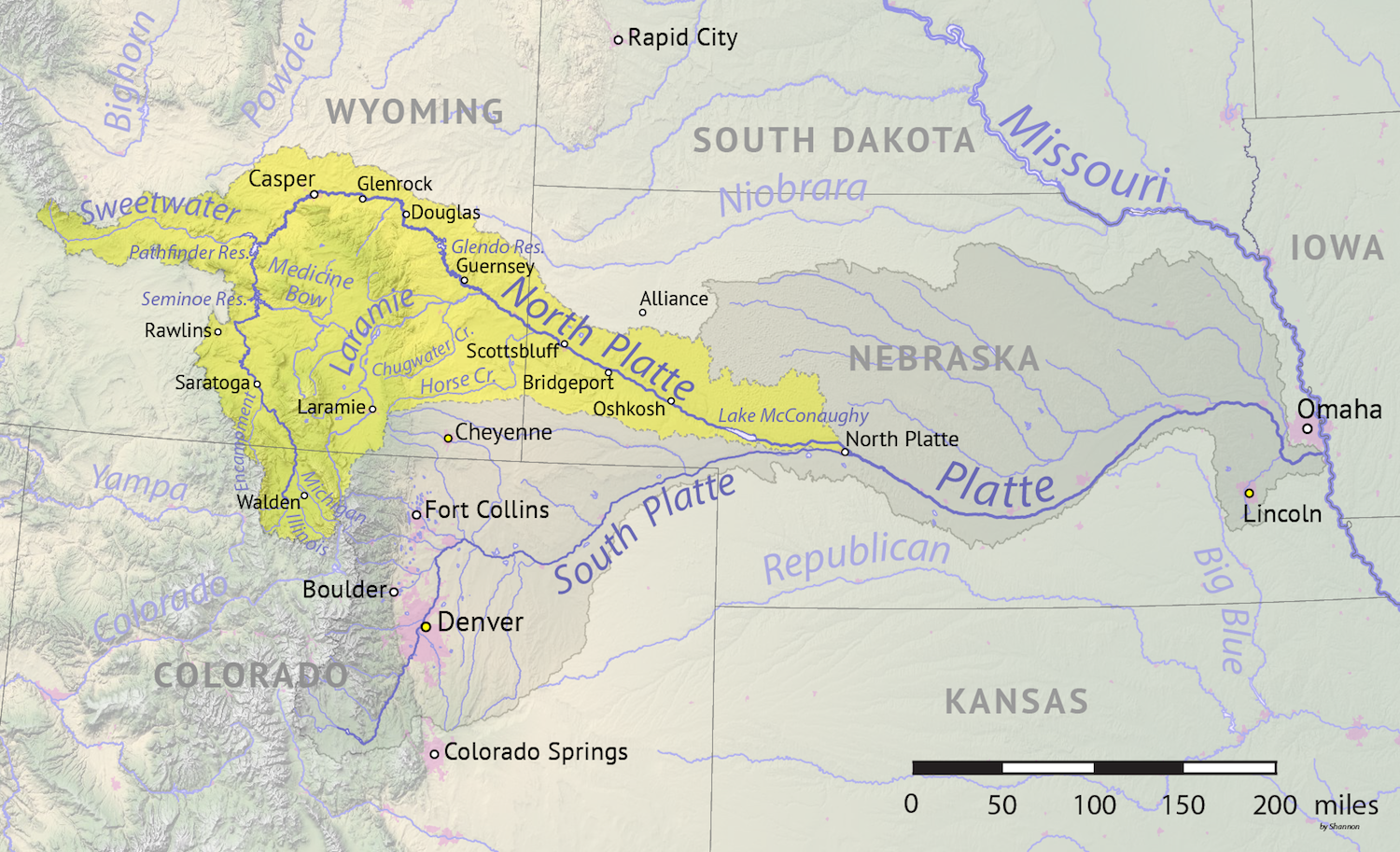
North Platte River and its tributaries

- Cheyenne River (SD)
  - Hat Creek
- White River
- Niobrara River
  - Burgess Creek
  - Bingham Creek
  - Snake River
  - Long Pine Creek
  - Keya Paha River
    - Spotted Tail Creek
  - Verdigre Creek
    - North Branch Verdigre Creek
    - Middle Branch Verdigre Creek
      - Lamb Creek
    - Merriman Creek
    - Cottonwood Creek
    - East Branch Verdigre Creek
    - South Branch Verdigre Creek
      - Big Springs Creek
        - Hathoway Slough
  - Schindler Creek
  - Soldier Creek
  - Pishel Creek
  - Steel Creek
  - Red Otter Creek
  - Sand Creek
  - Louse Creek
    - East Branch Louse Creek
    - West Branch Louse Creek
  - Redbird Creek
    - Spring Creek
    - Blackbird Creek
  - Eagle Creek
    - Camp Creek
    - Oak Creek
    - East Branch Eagle Creek
    - Middle Branch Eagle Creek
      - North Branch Eagle Creek
  - Turkey Creek
  - Brush Creek
    - Spring Creek
  - Little Sandy Creek
  - Big Sandy Creek
  - Beaver Creek
  - Clay Creek
  - Otter Creek
  - Simpson Creek
  - Big Anne Creek
    - Haughin Creek
  - Ash Creek
  - Oak Creek
  - Willow Creek
    - Sand Creek
  - Rock Creek
  - Laughing Water Creek
  - Coon Creek
  - Tarbell Creek
  - Elk Creek
  - Wyman Creek
  - Long Pine Creek
    - Short Pine Creek
    - Bone Creek
    - Willow Creek
  - Beeman Creek
  - Rickman Creek
  - Ponca Creek
  - Dutch Creek
  - Plum Creek
    - Deep Creek
    - Sand Draw
    - Little Minnie Creek
  - Fairfield Creek
    - South Fork Fairfield Creek
- Papillion Creek
- Platte River
  - North Platte River
  - South Platte River
    - Lodgepole Creek
  - Wood River
  - Loup River
    - North Loup River
      - Calamus River
    - Middle Loup River
      - Dismal River
      - South Loup River
    - Cedar River
  - Elkhorn River
    - South Fork Elkhorn River
    - North Fork Elkhorn River
    - Logan Creek Dredge
    - Rock Creek
  - Salt Creek
    - Oak Creek
    - Stevens Creek
    - Middle Creek
    - Antelope Creek
    - Elk Creek
    - Beal Slough
    - Haines Branch
    - Cardwell Branch
    - Lynn Creek
    - Deadman's Run
    - Little Salt Creek
- Nishnabotna River
- Little Nemaha River
- Big Nemaha River
- Kansas River (KS)
  - Republican River
    - North Fork Republican River
    - Arikaree River
    - Buffalo Creek
    - Rock Creek
    - South Fork Republican River
    - Frenchman Creek
    - Blackwood Creek
    - Driftwood Creek
    - Red Willow Creek
    - Medicine Creek
    - Sappa Creek
  - Big Blue River
    - West Fork Big Blue River
    - Little Blue River

== Alphabetically ==
- Arikaree River
- Beaver Creek
- Beaver Creek
- Big Blue River
- Big Nemaha River
- Brawner Creek
- Buckley Creek
- Calamus River
- Cedar River
- Coon Creek
- Dismal River
- Dry Branch
- Elkhorn River
- Frenchman Creek
- Keya Paha River
- Little Blue River
- Little Nemaha River
- Lodgepole Creek
- Logan Creek Dredge
- Long Pine Creek
- Loup River
- Middle Loup River
- Missouri River
- Niobrara River
- Nishnabotna River
- North Fork Elkhorn River
- North Loup River
- North Platte River
- Papillion Creek
- Platte River
- Ponca Creek
- Republican River
- Red Willow Creek
- Rock Creek
- Salt Creek
- Sappa Creek
- Silver Creek
- Smith Creek
- Snake River
- South Fork Elkhorn River
- South Loup River
- South Platte River
- Turkey Creek
- West Fork Big Blue River
- Whisky Run
- White River
- Wood River

== See also ==
- List of rivers in the United States
