= Silver Creek (Nebraska) =

Stream

Coordinates: 40.07057°N 97.23400°W

Silver Creek is a stream in Jefferson County, Nebraska and Washington County, Nebraska, in the United States.

According to legend, the discovery of silver ore at the creek's banks caused the name to be selected.

== See also ==
- List of rivers of Nebraska
