= Rock Creek (Niobrara River tributary) =

Stream in Nebraska, U.S.

Rock Creek Tributary to Niobrara River
- Location of Rock Creek mouth Rock Creek (Niobrara River tributary) (the United States)

Location
- Country: United States
- State: Nebraska
- County: Rock

Physical characteristics
- Source: North Fork Elkhorn River divide
  - location: about 5 miles northeast of Turkey Foot School
  - coordinates: 42°40′1.27″N 099°25′7.30″W
  - elevation: 2,250 ft (690 m)
- Mouth: Niobrara River
  - location: about 5 miles southwest of Dyer, Nebraska
  - coordinates: 42°45′34.50″N 099°25′44.10″W
  - elevation: 1,841 ft (561 m)
- Length: 7.66 mi (12.33 km)
- Basin size: 14.79 square miles (38.3 km^{2})
- Discharge
  - location: Niobrara River
  - average: 1.80 cu ft/s (0.051 m^{3}/s) at mouth with Niobrara River

Basin features
- Progression: Niobrara River → Missouri River → Mississippi
- River system: Niobrara
- Bridges: 888th Road, Atwood Road

Rock Creek is a 7.66 mi (12.33 km) long second-order tributary to the Niobrara River in Rock County, Nebraska.

Rock Creek rises on the North Fork Elkhorn River divide about 5 miles (8.0 km) northeast of Turkey Foot School and then flows generally north to join the Niobrara River about 5 miles (8.0 km) southwest of Dyer, Nebraska.

== Watershed ==
Rock Creek drains 14.79 square miles (38.3 km^{2}) of area, receives about 24.1 in/year (61 cm/year) of precipitation, and is about 2.94% forested.

== See also ==
- List of rivers of Nebraska
