= Coon Creek (Niobrara River tributary) =

Stream in Nebraska, U.S.

Coon Creek Tributary to Niobrara River
- Location of Coon Creek mouth Coon Creek (Niobrara River tributary) (the United States)

Location
- Country: United States
- State: Nebraska
- County: Rock

Physical characteristics
- Source: North Fork Elkhorn River divide
  - location: Dugger School
  - coordinates: 42°39′54.00″N 099°30′3.41″W
  - elevation: 2,230 ft (680 m)
- Mouth: Niobrara River
  - location: about 0.3 miles southwest of Carns, Nebraska
  - coordinates: 42°43′49.01″N 099°29′16.41″W
  - elevation: 1,870 ft (570 m)
- Length: 5.85 mi (9.41 km)
- Basin size: 9.86 square miles (25.5 km^{2})
- Discharge
  - location: Niobrara River
  - average: 1.21 cu ft/s (0.034 m^{3}/s) at mouth with Niobrara River

Basin features
- Progression: Niobrara River → Missouri River → Mississippi
- River system: Niobrara
- Bridges: Adair Road

Coon Creek is a 5.85 mi (9.41 km) long first-order tributary to the Niobrara River in Rock County, Nebraska.

Coon Creek rises on the divide of North Fork Elkhorn River and then flows generally north to join the Niobrara River about 0.3 miles (0.48 km) southwest of Carns, Nebraska.

== Watershed ==
Coon Creek drains 9.86 square miles (25.5 km^{2}) of area, receives about 23.8 in/year (60 cm/year) of precipitation, and is about 6.45% forested.

== See also ==
- List of rivers of Nebraska
