= Big Sandy Creek (Niobrara River tributary) =

Stream in Nebraska, U.S.

Big Sandy Creek Tributary to Niobrara River
- Location of Big Sandy Creek mouth Big Sandy Creek (Niobrara River tributary) (the United States)

Location
- Country: United States
- State: Nebraska
- County: Holt

Physical characteristics
- Source: Elkhorn River divide
  - location: about 3 miles southeast of School No. 188
  - coordinates: 42°36′38.01″N 099°02′36.35″W
  - elevation: 2,110 ft (640 m)
- Mouth: Niobrara River
  - location: about 0.5 miles northwest of Badger School
  - coordinates: 42°51′2.00″N 098°54′16.33″W
  - elevation: 1,595 ft (486 m)
- Length: 27.55 mi (44.34 km)
- Basin size: 113.65 square miles (294.4 km^{2})
- Discharge
  - location: Niobrara River
  - average: 11.99 cu ft/s (0.340 m^{3}/s) at mouth with Niobrara River

Basin features
- Progression: Niobrara River → Missouri River → Mississippi
- River system: Niobrara
- Tributaries
  - left: Springs Creek
- Bridges: 884th Road, 885th Road, 472nd Avenue, 887th Road, 472nd Avenue, 895th Road, 476th Avenue, 899th Road

Big Sandy Creek is a 27.55 mi (44.34 km) long third-order tributary to the Niobrara River in Holt County, Nebraska.

== Course ==
Big Sandy Creek rises on the Elkhorn River divide about 3 miles (4.8 km) southeast of School No. 188 in Holt County and then flows north and northeast to join the Niobrara River about 0.5 miles (0.80 km) northwest of Badger School.

== Watershed ==
Big Sandy Creek drains 113.65 square miles (294.4 km^{2}) of area, receives about 24.6 in/year (62 cm/year) of precipitation, and is about 1.29% forested.

== See also ==
- List of rivers of Nebraska
