= Whisky Run (Jefferson County, Nebraska) =

Coordinates: 40.1725020°N 97.2094815°W

Location
- Country: United States
- State: Nebraska
- County: Jefferson County

Whisky Run is a stream in Jefferson County, Nebraska, in the United States.

Whisky Run was so named because U.S. soldiers poured out a large quantity of seized whisky into its waters.

== See also ==
- List of rivers of Nebraska
