= Otter Creek (Niobrara River tributary) =

Stream in Nebraska, U.S.

Otter Creek Tributary to Niobrara River
- Location of Otter Creek mouth Otter Creek (Niobrara River tributary) (the United States)

Location
- Country: United States
- State: Nebraska
- County: Holt; Rock

Physical characteristics
- Source: Ash Creek divide
  - location: about 8 miles southwest of School No. 249
  - coordinates: 42°43′56.00″N 099°14′33.37″W
  - elevation: 2,100 ft (640 m)
- Mouth: Niobrara River
  - location: about 5 miles south-southeast of School No. 19
  - coordinates: 42°48′36.00″N 099°13′55.37″W
  - elevation: 1,752 ft (534 m)
- Length: 6.97 mi (11.22 km)
- Basin size: 18.57 square miles (48.1 km^{2})
- Discharge
  - location: Niobrara River
  - average: 2.23 cu ft/s (0.063 m^{3}/s) at mouth with Niobrara River

Basin features
- Progression: Niobrara River → Missouri River → Mississippi
- River system: Niobrara

Otter Creek is a 6.97 mi (11.22 km) long second-order tributary to the Niobrara River in Holt County, Nebraska.

== Course ==
Otter Creek rises on the Ash Creek divide about 8 miles (13 km) southwest of School No. 249 in Holt County and then flows northwest into Rock County and then northeast back to Holt County to join the Niobrara River about 5 miles (8.0 km) south-southeast of School No. 19.

== Watershed ==
Otter Creek drains 15.57 square miles (40.3 km^{2}) of area, receives about 24.3 in/year (62 cm/year) of precipitation, and is about 4.69% forested.

== See also ==
- List of rivers of Nebraska
