= Smith Creek (Nebraska) =

Stream in Jefferson County, Nebraska, U.S.

Coordinates: 40.075559°N 97.100033°W

Smith Creek is a stream in Jefferson County, Nebraska, in the United States.

Smith Creek was named for a pioneer settler.

== See also ==
- List of rivers of Nebraska
