= Brawner Creek =

Physical characteristics
- Source
  - coordinates: 40.1752799°N 97.1680912°W
  - elevation: 1293 feet
- Mouth
  - coordinates: 40.1138918°N 97.1636462°W
  - elevation: 394 feet

Brawner Creek is a stream in Jefferson County, Nebraska, in the United States. Brawner Creek was named for a pioneer settler.

== See also ==
- List of rivers of Nebraska
