= Clay Creek (Niobrara River tributary) =

Stream in Nebraska, U.S.

Clay Creek Tributary to Niobrara River
- Location of Clay Creek mouth Clay Creek (Niobrara River tributary) (the United States)

Location
- Country: United States
- State: Nebraska
- County: Holt

Physical characteristics
- Source: confluence of East and West Branches of Clay Creek
  - location: about 0.5 miles west-northwest of Clay Creek School
  - coordinates: 42°48′50.00″N 099°10′48.00″W
  - elevation: 1,795 ft (547 m)
- Mouth: Niobrara River
  - location: about 0.5 miles southeast of Tienkin Ranch
  - coordinates: 42°49′43.00″N 099°10′32.36″W
  - elevation: 1,716 ft (523 m)
- Length: 1.29 mi (2.08 km)
- Basin size: 6.73 square miles (17.4 km^{2})
- Discharge
  - location: Niobrara River
  - average: 0.86 cu ft/s (0.024 m^{3}/s) at mouth with Niobrara River

Basin features
- Progression: Niobrara River → Missouri River → Mississippi
- River system: Niobrara
- Tributaries
  - left: West Branch Clay Creek
  - right: East Branch Clay Creek
- Bridges: 896th Road

Clay Creek is a 1.29 mi (2.08 km) long second-order tributary to the Niobrara River in Holt County, Nebraska.

== Course ==
Clay Creek is formed at the confluence of East and West Branch Clay Creek about 0.5 miles (0.80 km) west-northwest of Clay Creek School in Holt County and then flows north-northeast to join the Niobrara River about 0.5 miles (0.80 km) southeast of Tienkin Ranch.

== Watershed ==
Clay Creek drains 6.73 square miles (17.4 km^{2}) of area, receives about 24.3 in/year (62 cm/year) of precipitation, and is about 4.73% forested.

== See also ==
- List of rivers of Nebraska
