= Niobrara National Forest =

Former National Forest of the United States

Coordinates: 42°55′16″N 100°26′21″W

Niobrara National Forest was established as the Niobrara Forest Reserve by the United States General Land Office in Nebraska on April 16, 1902 with 123,779 acres (50,092 ha). After the transfer of federal forests to the U.S. Forest Service in 1905, it became a National Forest on March 4, 1907. On July 1, 1908 the entire forest was combined with Nebraska National Forest and the name was discontinued. In 1971, the Niobrara reserve was designated as the Samuel R. McKelvie National Forest.
