= Dry Branch (Nebraska) =

Stream in Jefferson County, Nebraska, U.S.

Coordinates: 40.0697256°N 97.1361451°W

Dry Branch is a stream in Jefferson County, Nebraska, in the United States.

Dry Branch runs dry most of the year, hence the name.

== See also ==
- List of rivers of Nebraska
