= Sand Creek (Niobrara River tributary) =

Stream in Nebraska, USA

Sand Creek Tributary to Niobrara River
- Location of Sand Creek mouth Sand Creek (Niobrara River tributary) (the United States)

Location
- Country: United States
- State: Nebraska
- County: Holt

Physical characteristics
- Source: East Branch Louse Creek divide
  - location: about 3 miles west of Dorsey, Nebraska
  - coordinates: 42°40′16.00″N 098°24′28.29″W
  - elevation: 1,758 ft (536 m)
- Mouth: Niobrara River
  - location: about 3 miles southeast of Lynch, Nebraska
  - coordinates: 42°46′22.00″N 098°24′54.29″W
  - elevation: 1,388 ft (423 m)
- Length: 7.86 mi (12.65 km)
- Basin size: 8.63 square miles (22.4 km^{2})
- Discharge
  - location: Niobrara River
  - average: 1.06 cu ft/s (0.030 m^{3}/s) at mouth with Niobrara River

Basin features
- Progression: Niobrara River → Missouri River → Mississippi River → Gulf of Mexico
- River system: Niobrara
- Bridges: 888th Road, 505th Avenue, 893rd Road

Sand Creek is a 7.86 mi (12.65 km) long 1st order tributary to the Niobrara River in Holt County, Nebraska.

== Course ==
Sand Creek rises on the East Branch Louse Creek divide about 3 miles west of Dorsey, Nebraska in Holt County and then flows generally north to join the Niobrara River about 3 miles southeast of Lynch, Nebraska.

== Watershed ==
Sand Creek drains 8.63 square miles (22.4 km^{2}) of area, receives about 24.7 in/year of precipitation, has a wetness index of 548.03, and is about 1.90% forested.

== See also ==
- List of rivers of Nebraska
