= Simpson Creek (Niobrara River tributary) =

Stream in Nebraska, U.S.

Simpson Creek Tributary to Niobrara River
- Location of Simpson Creek mouth Simpson Creek (Niobrara River tributary) (the United States)

Location
- Country: United States
- State: Nebraska
- County: Keya Paha

Physical characteristics
- Source: Oak Creek divide
  - location: about 5 miles north-northeast of School No. 69
  - coordinates: 42°49′50.00″N 099°19′47.00″W
  - elevation: 2,080 ft (630 m)
- Mouth: Niobrara River
  - location: about 4 miles southeast of School No. 69
  - coordinates: 42°47′51.00″N 099°17′19.37″W
  - elevation: 1,778 ft (542 m)
- Length: 3.20 mi (5.15 km)
- Basin size: 4.00 square miles (10.4 km^{2})
- Discharge
  - location: Niobrara River
  - average: 0.52 cu ft/s (0.015 m^{3}/s) at mouth with Niobrara River

Basin features
- Progression: Niobrara River → Missouri River → Mississippi
- River system: Niobrara
- Bridges: 480th Avenue

Simpson Creek is a 3.20 mi (5.15 km) long second-order tributary to the Niobrara River in Keya Paha County, Nebraska.

Simpson Creek rises on the Oak Creek divide about 5 miles (8.0 km) north-northeast of School No. 69 in Keya Paha County and then flows southeast to join the Niobrara River about 4 miles (6.4 km) southeast of School No. 69.

== Watershed ==
Simpson Creek drains 4.00 square miles (10.4 km^{2}) of area, receives about 23.9 in/year (61 cm/year) of precipitation, and is about 6.25% forested.

== See also ==
- List of rivers of Nebraska
