= Buckley Creek =

Stream in Jefferson County, Nebraska, U.S.

Coordinates: 40.0622257°N 97.2636486°W

Buckley Creek is a stream in Jefferson County, Nebraska, in the United States.

Buckley Creek, formerly called Buckley Branch, was named for William Buckley, a pioneer who settled nearby.

== See also ==
- List of rivers of Nebraska
