= Beeman Creek (Niobrara River tributary) =

Stream in Nebraska, U.S.

Beeman Creek Tributary to Niobrara River
- Location of Beeman Creek mouth Beeman Creek (Niobrara River tributary) (the United States)

Location
- Country: United States
- State: Nebraska
- County: Keya Paha

Physical characteristics
- Source: Burton Creek divide
  - location: about 2.5 miles northeast of Highland Cemetery
  - coordinates: 42°47′27.00″N 099°38′32.41″W
  - elevation: 2,390 ft (730 m)
- Mouth: Niobrara River
  - location: about 3 miles northeast of School No. 29
  - coordinates: 42°43′42.00″N 099°37′41.42″W
  - elevation: 1,933 ft (589 m)
- Length: 5.52 mi (8.88 km)
- Basin size: 5.42 square miles (14.0 km^{2})
- Discharge
  - location: Niobrara River
  - average: 0.69 cu ft/s (0.020 m^{3}/s) at mouth with Niobrara River

Basin features
- Progression: Niobrara River → Missouri River → Mississippi
- River system: Niobrara
- Bridges: Riverview Road

Beeman Creek is a 5.52 mi (8.88 km) long second-order tributary to the Niobrara River in Keya Paha County, Nebraska.

Beeman Creek rises on the Burton Creek divide about 2.5 miles (4.0 km) northeast of Highland Cemetery in Keya Paha County and then flows south-southeast to join the Niobrara River about 3 miles (4.8 km) northeast of School No. 29.

== Watershed ==
Beeman Creek drains 5.42 square miles (14.0 km^{2}) of area, receives about 22.7 in/year (58 cm/year) of precipitation, and is about 40.08% forested.

== See also ==
- List of rivers of Nebraska
