= Rickman Creek (Niobrara River tributary) =

Stream in Nebraska, U.S.

Rickman Creek Tributary to Niobrara River
- Location of Rickman Creek mouth Rickman Creek (Niobrara River tributary) (the United States)

Location
- Country: United States
- State: Nebraska
- County: Keya Paha

Physical characteristics
- Source: Burton Creek divide
  - location: about 1.5 miles southwest of Highland Cemetery
  - coordinates: 42°46′35.00″N 099°40′53.42″W
  - elevation: 2,400 ft (730 m)
- Mouth: Niobrara River
  - location: about 3 miles north of School No. 29
  - coordinates: 42°44′4.00″N 099°38′59.42″W
  - elevation: 1,939 ft (591 m)
- Length: 4.00 mi (6.44 km)
- Basin size: 3.53 square miles (9.1 km^{2})
- Discharge
  - location: Niobrara River
  - average: 0.46 cu ft/s (0.013 m^{3}/s) at mouth with Niobrara River

Basin features
- Progression: Niobrara River → Missouri River → Mississippi
- River system: Niobrara
- Bridges: Riverview Road

Rickman Creek is a 4.00 mi (6.44 km) long second-order tributary to the Niobrara River in Keya Paha County, Nebraska.

Rickman Creek rises on the Burton Creek divide about 1.5 miles (2.4 km) southwest of Highland Cemetery in Keya Paha County and then flows south-southeast to join the Niobrara River about 4 miles (6.4 km) north of School No. 29.

== Watershed ==
Rickman Creek drains 3.53 square miles (9.1 km^{2}) of area, receives about 22.6 in/year (57 cm/year) of precipitation, and is about 46.02% forested.

== See also ==
- List of rivers of Nebraska
