= Laughing Water Creek (Niobrara River tributary) =

Stream in Nebraska, U.S.

Laughing Water Creek Tributary to Niobrara River
- Location of Laughing Water Creek mouth Laughing Water Creek (Niobrara River tributary) (the United States)

Location
- Country: United States
- State: Nebraska
- County: Rock

Physical characteristics
- Source: confluence of East Branch and West Branch Laughing Water Creek
  - location: about 1 mile south-southwest of Carns, Nebraska
  - coordinates: 42°43′29.00″N 099°29′4.00″W
  - elevation: 1,883 ft (574 m)
- Mouth: Niobrara River
  - location: about 0.25 miles southwest of Carns, Nebraska
  - coordinates: 42°43′48.00″N 099°29′13.41″W
  - elevation: 1,870 ft (570 m)
- Length: 0.39 mi (0.63 km)
- Basin size: 10.80 square miles (28.0 km^{2})
- Discharge
  - location: Niobrara River
  - average: 1.33 cu ft/s (0.038 m^{3}/s) at mouth with Niobrara River

Basin features
- Progression: Niobrara River → Missouri River → Mississippi
- River system: Niobrara
- Bridges: 449th Road

Laughing Water Creek is a 0.39 mi (0.63 km) long second-order tributary to the Niobrara River in Rock County, Nebraska.

Laughing Water Creek is formed at the confluence of East Branch and West Branch of Laughing Water Creek and then flows generally north to join the Niobrara River about 0.25 miles (0.40 km) southwest of Carns, Nebraska.

== Watershed ==
Laughing Water Creek drains 10.80 square miles (28.0 km^{2}) of area, receives about 23.9 in/year (61 cm/year) of precipitation, and is about 4.33% forested.

== See also ==
- List of rivers of Nebraska
