= Little Sandy Creek (Niobrara River tributary) =

Stream in Nebraska, U.S.

Little Sandy Creek Tributary to Niobrara River
- Location of Little Sandy Creek mouth Little Sandy Creek (Niobrara River tributary) (the United States)

Location
- Country: United States
- State: Nebraska
- County: Holt

Physical characteristics
- Source: Brush Creek divide
  - location: about 2 miles south-southeast of Badger School
  - coordinates: 42°49′21.00″N 098°53′11.00″W
  - elevation: 1,675 ft (511 m)
- Mouth: Niobrara River
  - location: about 0.25 miles southeast of Badger School
  - coordinates: 42°50′22.00″N 098°53′8.33″W
  - elevation: 1,588 ft (484 m)
- Length: 1.24 mi (2.00 km)
- Basin size: 10.04 square miles (26.0 km^{2})
- Discharge
  - location: Niobrara River
  - average: 1.24 cu ft/s (0.035 m^{3}/s) at mouth with Niobrara River

Basin features
- Progression: Niobrara River → Missouri River → Mississippi
- River system: Niobrara
- Bridges: 898th Road

Little Sandy Creek is a 1.24 mi (2.00 km) long first-order tributary to the Niobrara River in Holt County, Nebraska.

== Course ==
Little Sandy Creek rises on the Brush Creek divide about 2 miles (3.2 km) south-southeast of Badger School in Holt County and then flows generally north to join the Niobrara River about 0.25 miles (0.40 km) southeast of Badger School.

== Watershed ==
Little Sandy Creek drains 10.04 square miles (26.0 km^{2}) of area, receives about 24.7 in/year (63 cm/year) of precipitation, and is about 0.87% forested.

== See also ==
- List of rivers of Nebraska
