= Niobrara River =

River in Wyoming and Nebraska, United States

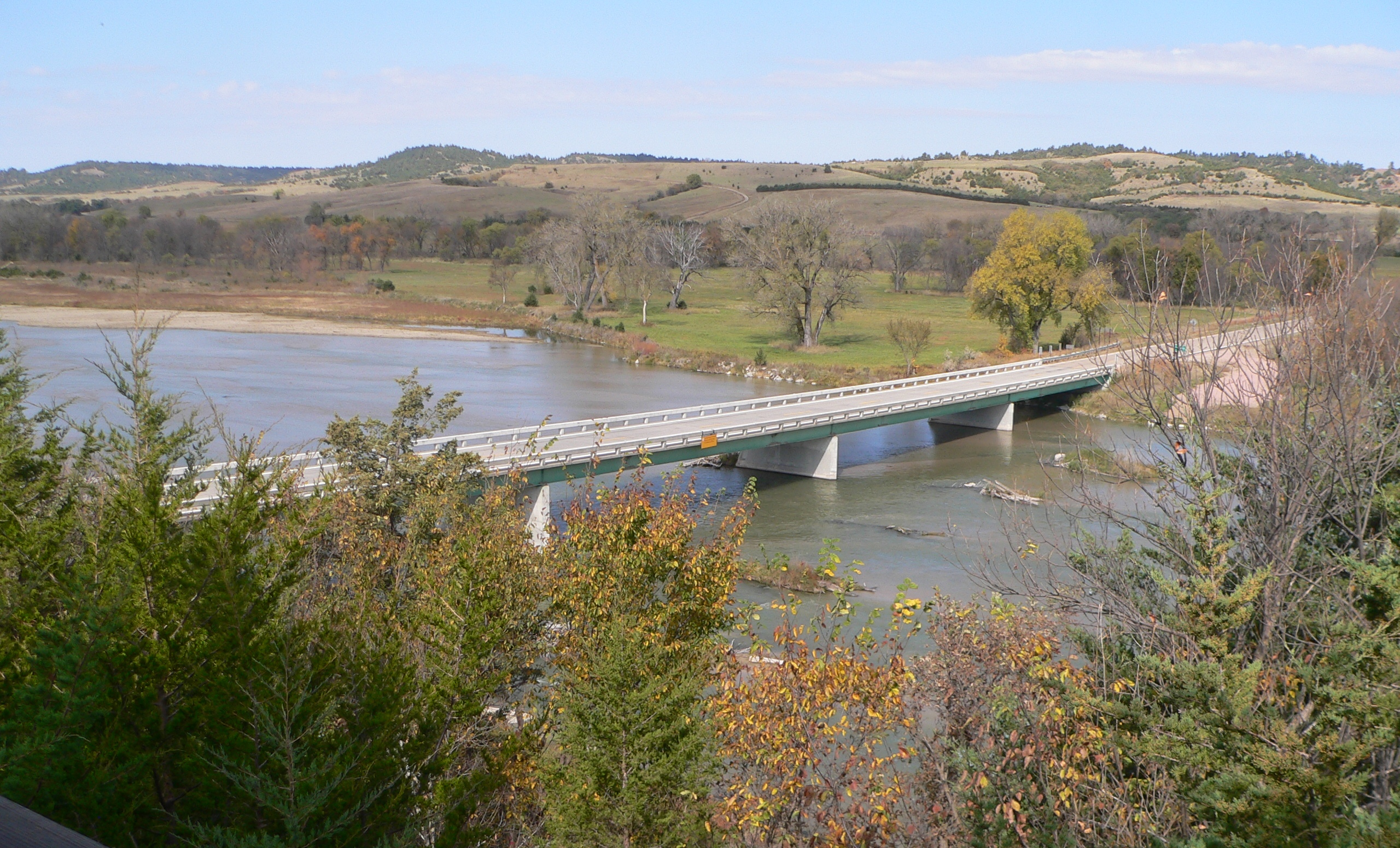
- Niobrara River at the Nebraska Highway 7 crossing

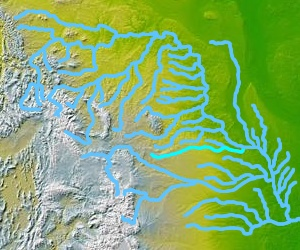
- Map of the Niobrara River (light blue)
- Etymology: Ponca, Ní Ubthátha khe, translating to "water spread-out horizontal-the"
- Native name: Ní Ubthátha khe (Omaha–Ponca)

Location
- Country: United States
- State: Wyoming, Nebraska
- Cities: Niobrara, Nebraska, Anncar, Nebraska, Valentine, Nebraska, Agate, Nebraska, Van Tassell, Wyoming, Lusk, Wyoming

Physical characteristics
- Source
  - location: Niobrara County, near Manville, Wyoming
  - coordinates: 42°49′15″N 104°38′50″W
  - elevation: 5,500 ft (1,700 m)
- Mouth: Missouri River
  - location: Knox County, near Niobrara, Nebraska
  - coordinates: 42°45′58″N 98°02′50″W
  - elevation: 1,211 ft (369 m)
- Length: 568 mi (914 km)
- Basin size: 11,580 sq mi (30,000 km^{2})
- Discharge
  - location: Verdel, NE
  - average: 1,718 cu ft/s (48.6 m^{3}/s)
  - minimum: 102 cu ft/s (2.9 m^{3}/s)
  - maximum: 39,100 cu ft/s (1,110 m^{3}/s)

Basin features
- Tributaries
  - left: Rickman Creek, Beeman Creek, Wyman Creek, Tarbell Creek, Big Anne Creek, Simpson Creek, Keya Paha River
  - right: Snake River, Fairfield Creek, Plum Creek, Dutch Creek, Long Pine Creek, Elk Creek, Coon Creek, Laughing Water Creek, Rock Creek, Willow Creek, Oak Creek, Ash Creek, Otter Creek, Clay Creek, Beaver Creek, Big Sandy Creek, Little Sandy Creek, Brush Creek, Turkey Creek, Eagle Creek, Redbird Creek, Louse Creek, Sand Creek, Red Otter Creek, Steel Creek, Pishel Creek, Soldier Creek, Schindler Creek, Verdigre Creek, Bingham Creek, Burgess Creek

National Wild and Scenic River
- Designated: May 24, 1991

The Niobrara River (/ˌnaɪ.əˈbrærə/; Omaha–Ponca: Ní Ubthátha khe, pronounced [nĩꜜ ubɫᶞaꜜɫᶞa kʰe], literally "water spread-out horizontal-the" or "The Wide-Spreading Water") is a tributary of the Missouri River, approximately 568 miles (914 km) long, running through the U.S. states of Wyoming and Nebraska. The river drains one of the most arid sections of the Great Plains, and has a low flow for a river of its length. The Niobrara's watershed includes the northern tier of Nebraska Sandhills, a small south-central section of South Dakota, as well as a small area of eastern Wyoming.

== Course ==
The river rises in the High Plains of Wyoming, in southern Niobrara County. The Niobrara flows east as an intermittent stream past Lusk and southeast into northwestern Nebraska. It then flows southeast across the Pine Ridge country of Sioux County, then east through Agate Fossil Beds National Monument, past Marsland, and through Box Butte Reservoir. The stream flows east across northern Nebraska, near the northern edge of the Sandhills and past Valentine. It is joined by the Snake River about 13 miles (21 km) southwest of Valentine. In north-central Nebraska it is joined by the Keya Paha River approximately 6 miles (10 km) west of Butte. The river joins the Missouri northwest of Niobrara in northern Knox County, just upstream of Lewis and Clark Lake. Its total drainage basin is about 11,580 square miles (30,000 km^{2}).

=== Discharge ===
Although the annual runoff is low relative to the size of its drainage basin, the Niobrara has a stronger and more consistent flow than many other streams in the region. An estimated 70 percent of the river's water results from seepage from the Ogallala Aquifer that underlies the area, with the remaining 30 percent from precipitation. The river is highest in the spring and early summer (February through April) and lowest in early fall (August and September). By late fall, river levels begin to rise as demands for river water for irrigation subside.

The Niobrara's average discharge between 1958 and 2013, measured at the U.S. Geological Survey stream gage at Verdel, Nebraska, 14.8 miles (23.8 km) above the mouth, is 1,757 cubic feet per second (49.8 m^{3}/s). The highest flow recorded was 39,100 cubic feet per second (1,110 m^{3}/s) on March 27, 1960. The lowest daily mean was 102 cubic feet per second (2.9 m^{3}/s) on November 13, 1960.

== History ==
The lower Niobrara valley is the traditional home of the Ponca tribe of Native Americans. Between 1861 and 1882, the stretch of the Niobrara River from the mouth of the Keya Paha to its confluence with the Missouri marked the boundary between Nebraska and the Dakota Territory.

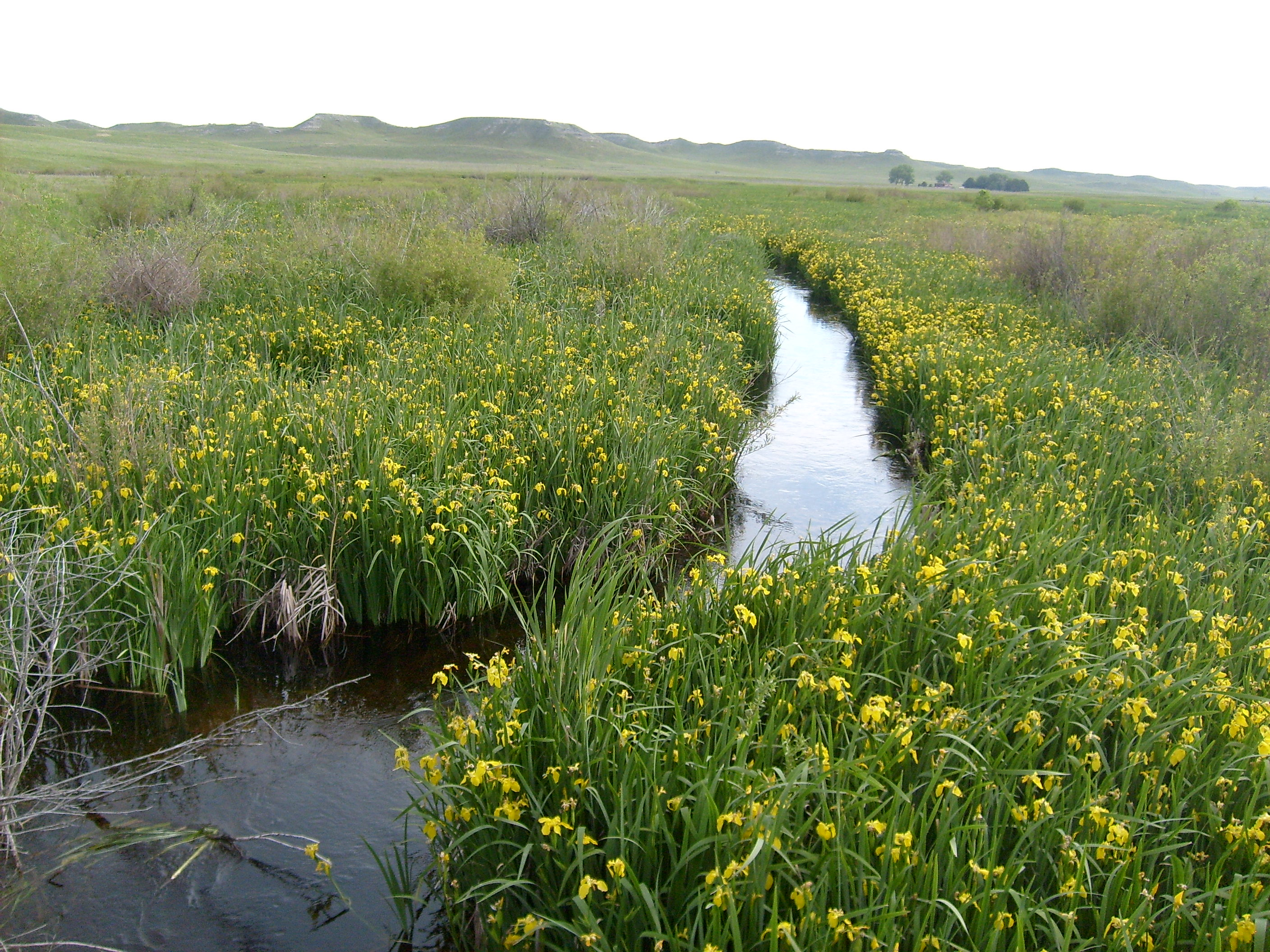
Niobrara River flowing through Agate Fossil Beds National Monument, near its headwaters

=== National Scenic River ===
A 76-mile (122 km) stretch of the Niobrara River in central Nebraska, from the town of Valentine east to Nebraska State Highway 137, has been designated as the Niobrara National Scenic River since 1991. It is managed by the Department of the Interior (U.S. Fish & Wildlife Service and National Park Service) to protect the water quality, geologic, paleontologic, fish and wildlife, scenic and recreation values.

Most of the lands within the boundary of the National Scenic River are, and will remain, in private ownership. Management is based upon working with private, county, state and federal landowners and stakeholders to coordinate protection of the river while ensuring a quality experience for river visitors. The U.S. Fish and Wildlife Service manages the 9 miles of river that flow through the Fort Niobrara Refuge primarily for wilderness and wildlife habitat, but allows recreation downstream from Cornell Dam. The National Park Service manages the remaining 67 miles, acting as a facilitator for resource protection by landowners and river users, providing law enforcement and visitor education services, and coordinating resource management activities.

== River modifications ==
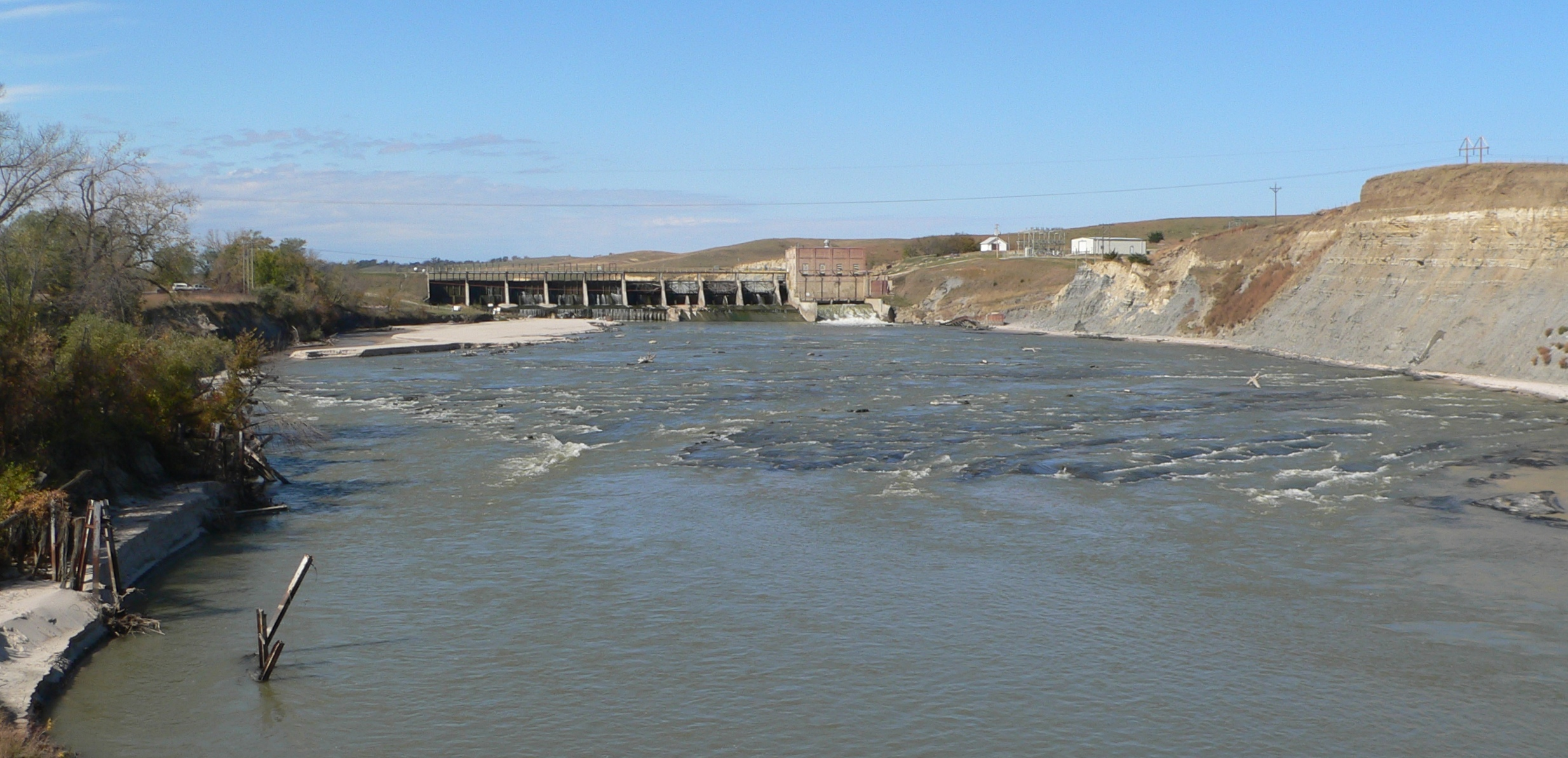
Spencer Dam in 2010

The Box Butte Dam, completed in 1946 by the U.S. Bureau of Reclamation (USBR), is the only major dam on the Niobrara River proper. Located in Dawes County in western Nebraska, the dam is part of the Mirage Flats Project, which irrigates 11,670 acres (4,720 ha) on the north side of the Niobrara River. Dunlap Diversion Dam, 8 miles (13 km) below Box Butte, diverts water through a 13-mile (21 km) canal to the farmland.

The Snake River tributary is impounded by the Merritt Dam and irrigates about 34,540 acres (13,980 ha) in the area of Valentine, Nebraska. The project is part of the Ainsworth Unit of the Pick-Sloan Missouri Basin Program, also operated by the USBR.

Cornell Dam, built in 1915 at the confluence of Minnechaduza Creek near Valentine, generated power until 1985. The following year the dam was acquired by the U.S. Department of the Interior. Although officially decommissioned, the dam remains standing. The feasibility of removing the defunct dam has been studied, although the accumulation of sediment behind the dam, which may include high levels of chemicals from pesticides, may be harmful to the river environment if released.

Spencer Dam, about 50 miles (80 km) from the mouth of the Niobrara, was the last operational hydroelectric plant on the river. The dam was built in 1927 and was operated by the Nebraska Public Power District. It includes two Westinghouse generators, with a combined capacity of 3,000 kW. In a 2015 agreement with Nebraska local and state government entities, NPPD agreed to decommission the dam in 2017. The dam was breached by flooding caused by a March 2019 storm.

== Native American languages ==
In the Cheyenne language, the river is Hisse Yovi Yoe, meaning "surprise river"; in Pawnee, Kíckatariʾ; and in Lakota, Wakpá Tȟáŋka, meaning "great river".

== See also ==
- Agate Fossil Beds National Monument
- Box Butte Reservoir
- Fort Niobrara, a U.S. Army outpost (1880–1906)
- Fort Niobrara National Wildlife Refuge
- Niobrara National Scenic River
- Niobrara State Park, located at the confluence of the Niobrara and Missouri Rivers
- Samuel R. McKelvie National Forest
- Smith Falls
- List of longest rivers of the United States (by main stem)
- List of Nebraska rivers
- List of Wyoming rivers
