= Riverview, Nebraska =

Unincorporated community in Nebraska, U.S.

Coordinates: 42°43′45″N 99°35′22″W

Riverview is an unincorporated community in Keya Paha County, Nebraska, United States.

== History ==
Riverview was named from its scenic setting upon the Niobrara River.

A post office was established at Riverview in 1912, and remained in operation until it was discontinued in 1957.
