= Samuel R. McKelvie National Forest =

Forest in Nebraska, United States

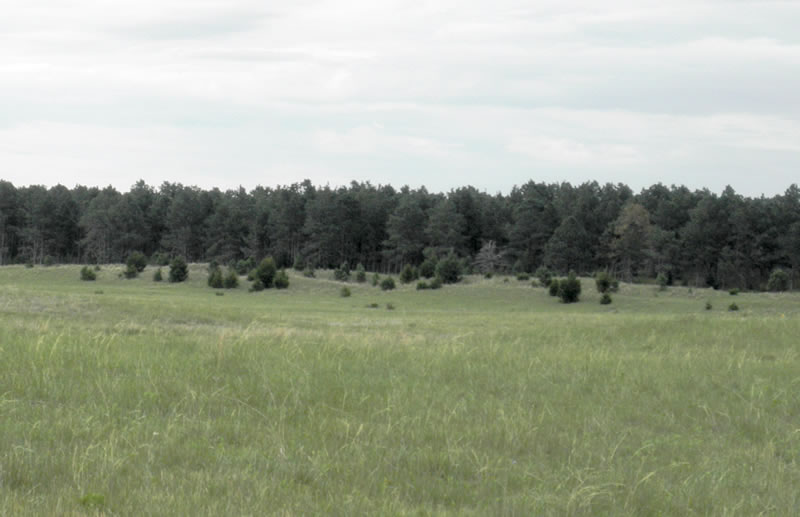
- Typical Sandhills scene with planted ponderosa pine forest at McKelvie National Forest, Nebraska

- Location within the United States Location within Nebraska
- Location: Cherry County, Nebraska, U.S.
- Nearest city: Valentine, NE
- Coordinates: 42°42′N 101°02′W
- Area: 116,079 acres (469.76 km^{2})
- Established: October 15, 1971
- Named for: Gov. Samuel R. McKelvie
- Governing body: U.S. Forest Service
- Website: Samuel R. McKelvie National Forest

The Samuel R. McKelvie National Forest is a United States national forest in the north-central Sandhills region of the U.S. state of Nebraska. The national forest covers an area of 116,079 acres (181.373 mi^{2}). The forest is managed as part of the U.S. Forest Service's Nebraska National Forests and Grasslands, from ranger district offices in Halsey, Nebraska. The national forest is entirely within Cherry County, Nebraska.

== History ==
In 1902, President Theodore Roosevelt issued a proclamation establishing the Niobrara Forest Reserve, later the Niobrara Ranger District of the Nebraska National Forest. On October 15, 1971, President Richard Nixon designated the Niobrara Division as the Samuel R. McKelvie National Forest, honoring former Governor Samuel R. McKelvie.

== Flora and fauna ==
The forest is a combination of prairie grasslands and pine forest "islands". Most of the existing forested sections were manmade, planted by hand over the past 75 years. The protein content of the native grasses is among the highest found anywhere in the world and numerous lease options are provided to local ranchers. Planted trees include eastern juniper, Scots pine and ponderosa pine which continues to need replanting as it is harvested but has also managed to spread throughout the region independently.

Indigenous wildlife such as pronghorn, white-tailed deer, mule deer, coyote and fox are plentiful. Among the 150 species of birds known to inhabit the forest, pheasant, grouse, hawk and wild turkey are the more commonly found.

== Recreation ==
The forest has a small campground. Merritt Reservoir, a dam on the Snake River, is located immediately to the south and east of the national forest. The reservoir is stocked with sport fish; it is considered one of the better fishing destinations in Nebraska. Merritt Reservoir is managed by the Nebraska Game and Parks Commission.

== Management and additional lands ==
The Nebraska National Forest is managed by the Nebraska National Forests and Grasslands Supervisor's Office in Chadron. Additionally, this office manages the following public lands:

- Nebraska National Forest
- Buffalo Gap National Grassland
- Fort Pierre National Grassland
- Oglala National Grassland

== See also ==
- List of national forests of the United States
