= Star, Nebraska =

Unincorporated community in Nebraska, U.S.

Coordinates: 42°36′41″N 98°20′25″W

Star is an unincorporated community in Holt County, Nebraska, United States.

== History ==
The founder selected the name Star for its simplicity. Star once had a post office.
