= Mariaville, Nebraska =

Unincorporated community in Rock County, Nebraska, United States

Coordinates: 42°46′31″N 99°20′07″W

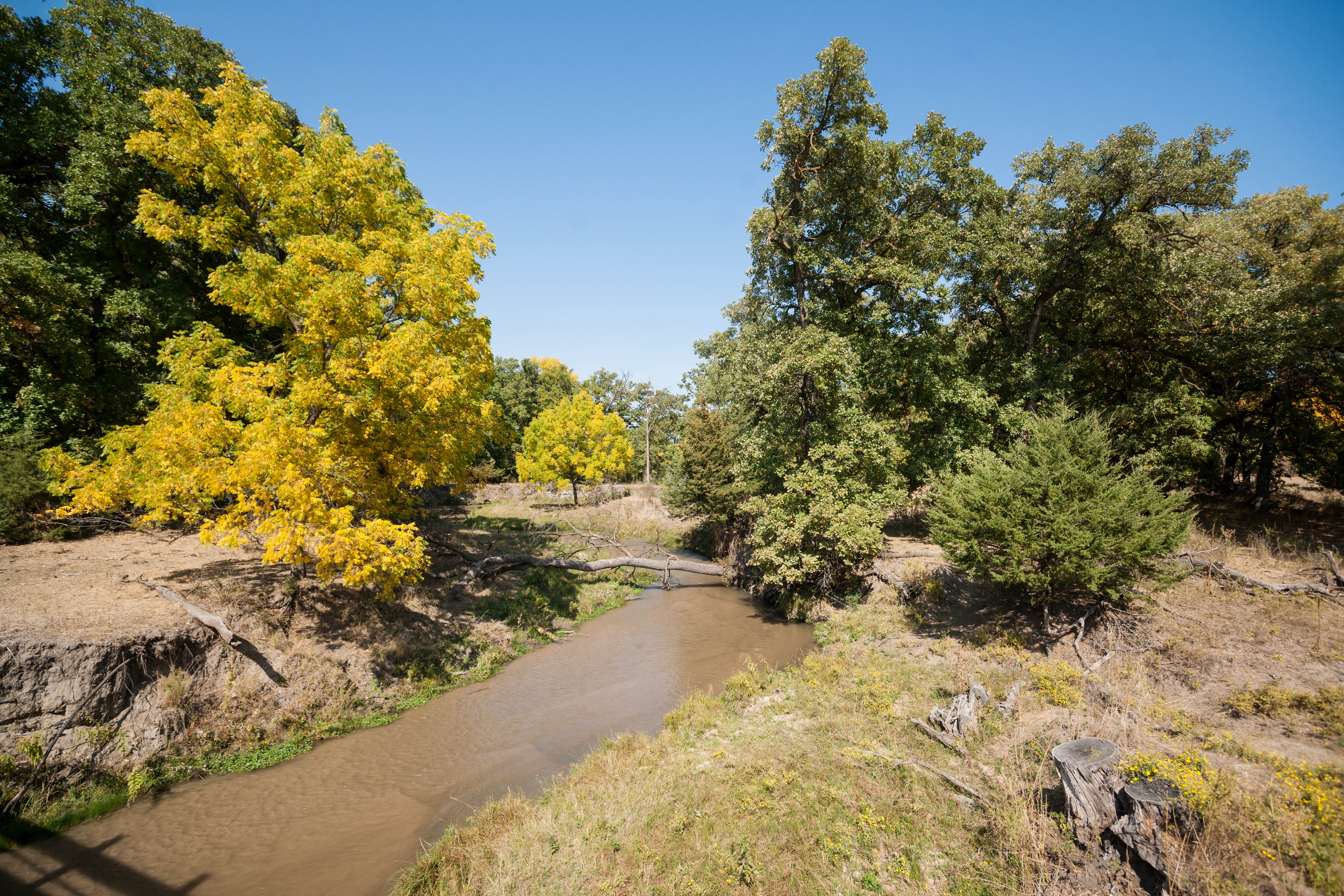
Mariaville, Nebraska

Mariaville is an unincorporated community in Rock County, Nebraska, United States.

== History ==
Mariaville had a post office between 1882 and 1957. The community was named for Harriet Maria Peacock, the first white child born in the area.
