= Valentine, Nebraska =

- City
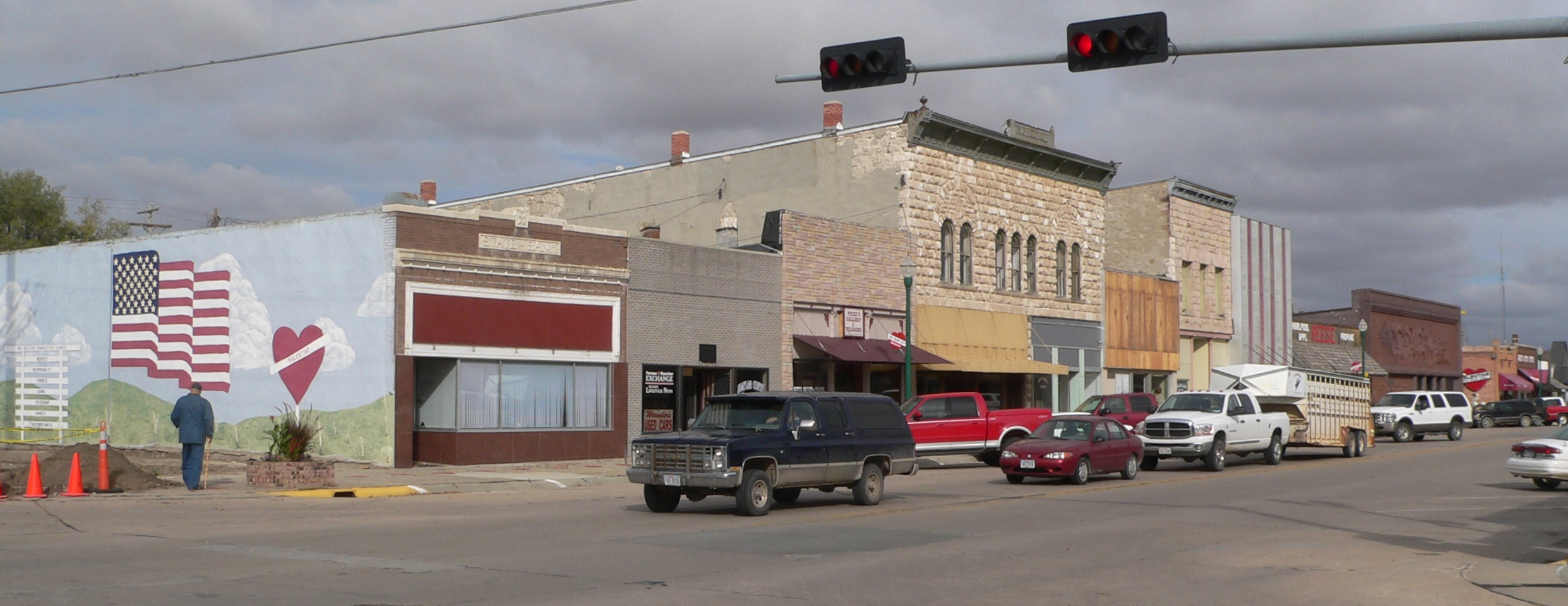
- Main Street (2010)

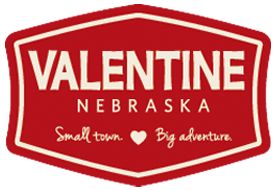
- Seal
- Nickname: America's Heart City
- Location of Valentine, Nebraska

- Location in the U.S. state of Nebraska Valentine (the United States)
- Coordinates: 42°52′25″N 100°33′1″W
- Country: United States
- State: Nebraska
- County: Cherry
- Named for: Edward K. Valentine

Area
  - Total: 2.64 sq mi (6.85 km^{2})
  - Land: 2.63 sq mi (6.82 km^{2})
  - Water: 0.012 sq mi (0.03 km^{2})
- Elevation: 2,579 ft (786 m)

Population (2020)
  - Total: 2,633
  - Density: 999.3/sq mi (385.84/km^{2})
- Time zone: UTC−6 (Central (CST))
  - Summer (DST): UTC−5 (CDT)
- ZIP code: 69201
- Area code: 402
- FIPS code: 31-49950
- GNIS ID: 2397108
- Website: valentinene.gov

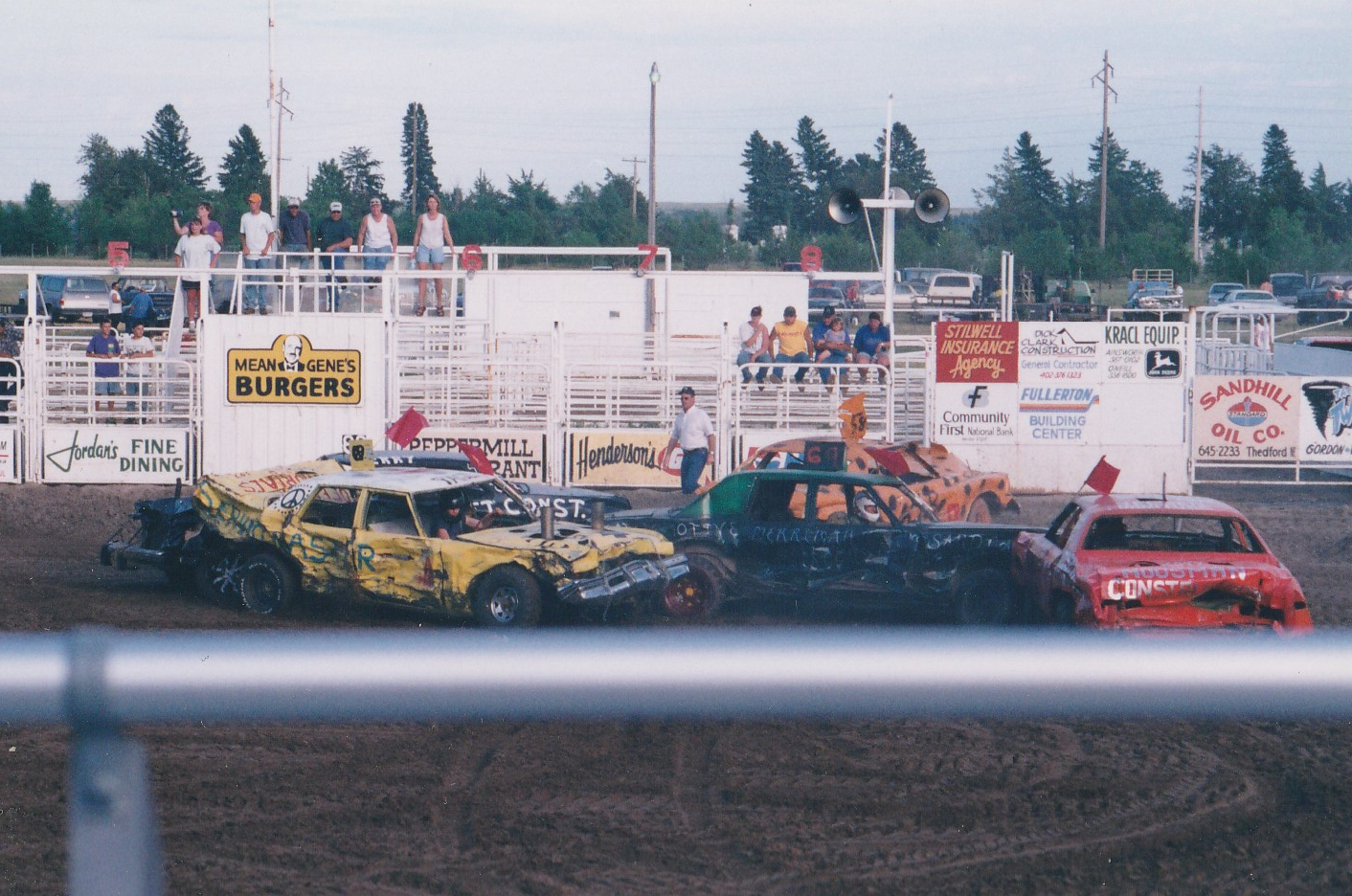
Demolition derby at fair grounds

Valentine is a city in and the county seat of Cherry County, Nebraska, United States. The population was 2,633 at the 2020 census. It is the hometown of former vice-presidential candidate Tim Walz.

== History ==
Valentine was founded in 1882. The Valentine post office was established on December 4, 1882. The Sioux City and Pacific Railroad was extended to that point and train service began on April 1, 1883. It was named for Edward K. Valentine, a Nebraska representative.

As late as 1967, Valentine was split between two time zones. According to a news report, "The mountain and central time zones meet at the center of Main Street, so an hour separates the two curb lines." According to the report, when clocks were required to be set back one hour for daylight saving time, Valentine's post office (which was in the central zone) split the difference and turned back its clock by half an hour.

Valentine participates in an annual re-mailing program where thousands of pieces of mail flow into the local United States Post Office so that they can be re-mailed with a special Valentine's Day postmark and verse.

In 2007, National Geographic Adventure magazine included Valentine in its list of the best 100 adventure towns and cities.

In the Lakota language, Valentine is known as Oínažiŋ or Mnináȟaȟa Otȟúŋwahe, meaning "station stopping place" or "water and waterfall city".

== Geography ==
According to the United States Census Bureau, the city has an area of 2.25 square miles (5.83 km^{2}), of which 2.22 square miles (5.75 km^{2}) is land and 0.03 square miles (0.08 km^{2}) is water.

Valentine is immediately north of the Niobrara River, on the northern edge of the Sandhills physiographic region. Merritt Reservoir, created by a dam on the Snake River, is approximately 30 miles (48 km) southwest of Valentine. Snake River Falls is on the Snake River between the reservoir (a few miles downstream) and Valentine. Smith Falls, Nebraska's tallest waterfall, is on a small stream tributary to the Niobrara River about 15 miles (24 km) east of Valentine in Smith Falls State Park.

Just south of Valentine, a pair of bridges span the Niobrara River. The modern bridge carries traffic north and south along U.S. Route 83. Just to the west, an arched cantilever truss bridge named the Bryan Bridge is also open to through traffic. Designed by Josef Sorkin and built in 1932, the Bryan Bridge is made of steel and is listed on the National Register of Historic Places. A large red neon heart (a star during the Christmas season) is on the pine-covered Minnechaduza Creek canyon wall at the north end of Main Street.

=== Climate ===
Climate chart for Valentine

With a humid continental climate (Köppen Dwa), Valentine experiences extremes of heat and cold annually; it is part of USDA Hardiness zone 4b. The normal monthly mean temperature ranges from 24.5 °F (−4.2 °C) in January to 75.7 °F (24.3 °C) in July. In an average year, seven afternoons reach 100 °F (37.8 °C) or higher, 41.3 days reach 90 °F (32.2 °C) or higher, 41.2 afternoons do not climb above freezing, and 17.9 mornings reach 0 °F (−17.8 °C) or lower. The average window for freezing temperatures is September 25 thru May 11, allowing a growing season of 136 days. Extreme temperatures officially range from −39 °F (−39.4 °C) on December 22, 1989, to 114 °F (45.6 °C) on July 2, 1990, with temperatures reaching 110 °F (43.3 °C) as recently as July 21, 2012; the record low daily maximum is −17 °F (−27.2 °C) on January 12, 1916, while the record high daily minimum is 81 °F (27.2 °C) on July 24, 1940, and July 25, 1899.

Precipitation is low, with an annual average of around 20.90 inches (530.9 mm), but not quite low enough for the climate to be classified as semi-arid; it has ranged from 10.14 inches (257.6 mm) in 1894 to 32.68 inches (830.1 mm) in 1977. The very dry winters—as dry as the driest desert areas of the Southwest—mean snowfall is modest, averaging 34.2 inches (87 cm) per season (peaking in February and March), and ranging from 12.7 inches (32 cm) in 1984–85 to 88.5 inches (220 cm) in 1919–20; the average window for measurable (≥0.1 inches (0.25 cm)) snowfall is October 27 thru April 11, with May snow being rare.

Climate data for Valentine, Nebraska (Miller Field), 1991–2020 normals, extremes 1889–present (Note: Official records for Valentine kept at the Weather Bureau Office from July 1889 to July 20, 1955 and at Miller Field since July 21, 1955.)
Month	Jan	Feb	Mar	Apr	May	Jun	Jul	Aug	Sep	Oct	Nov	Dec	Year
Record high °F (°C)	72 (22)	78 (26)	87 (31)	100 (38)	102 (39)	110 (43)	114 (46)	108 (42)	106 (41)	96 (36)	86 (30)	76 (24)	114 (46)
Mean maximum °F (°C)	60.8 (16.0)	64.8 (18.2)	77.1 (25.1)	84.6 (29.2)	91.4 (33.0)	97.2 (36.2)	103.4 (39.7)	101.2 (38.4)	97.0 (36.1)	87.5 (30.8)	74.9 (23.8)	61.1 (16.2)	104.5 (40.3)
Mean daily maximum °F (°C)	37.8 (3.2)	40.9 (4.9)	51.6 (10.9)	61.2 (16.2)	72.0 (22.2)	83.0 (28.3)	90.4 (32.4)	88.4 (31.3)	79.8 (26.6)	64.5 (18.1)	50.6 (10.3)	39.4 (4.1)	63.3 (17.4)
Daily mean °F (°C)	24.5 (−4.2)	27.6 (−2.4)	37.6 (3.1)	47.2 (8.4)	58.1 (14.5)	69.0 (20.6)	75.7 (24.3)	73.6 (23.1)	64.2 (17.9)	49.3 (9.6)	36.2 (2.3)	26.3 (−3.2)	49.1 (9.5)
Mean daily minimum °F (°C)	11.2 (−11.6)	14.2 (−9.9)	23.5 (−4.7)	33.1 (0.6)	44.2 (6.8)	54.9 (12.7)	61.0 (16.1)	58.7 (14.8)	48.6 (9.2)	34.2 (1.2)	21.8 (−5.7)	13.1 (−10.5)	34.9 (1.6)
Mean minimum °F (°C)	−14.0 (−25.6)	−10.2 (−23.4)	0.1 (−17.7)	14.6 (−9.7)	27.6 (−2.4)	40.8 (4.9)	47.9 (8.8)	44.9 (7.2)	31.5 (−0.3)	15.1 (−9.4)	0.1 (−17.7)	−9.9 (−23.3)	−20.3 (−29.1)
Record low °F (°C)	−38 (−39)	−37 (−38)	−29 (−34)	−8 (−22)	17 (−8)	30 (−1)	38 (3)	34 (1)	12 (−11)	−6 (−21)	−22 (−30)	−39 (−39)	−39 (−39)
Average precipitation inches (mm)	0.32 (8.1)	0.61 (15)	1.01 (26)	2.48 (63)	3.52 (89)	3.96 (101)	2.82 (72)	2.04 (52)	1.72 (44)	1.42 (36)	0.57 (14)	0.43 (11)	20.90 (531)
Average snowfall inches (cm)	4.4 (11)	6.5 (17)	6.0 (15)	5.6 (14)	0.1 (0.25)	0.0 (0.0)	0.0 (0.0)	0.0 (0.0)	0.0 (0.0)	2.0 (5.1)	4.6 (12)	5.0 (13)	34.2 (87)
Average precipitation days (≥ 0.01 in)	4.9	5.7	6.9	9.6	11.8	11.2	9.3	8.1	6.8	7.2	4.8	4.8	91.1
Average snowy days (≥ 0.1 in)	3.8	4.7	4.0	2.4	0.1	0.0	0.0	0.0	0.0	1.1	2.9	3.9	22.9
Average relative humidity (%)	64.4	64.6	62.9	55.4	57.4	55.7	54.9	57.6	54.5	57.3	62.4	64.3	59.3
Average dew point °F (°C)	8.8 (−12.9)	12.7 (−10.7)	21.6 (−5.8)	29.3 (−1.5)	40.8 (4.9)	50.0 (10.0)	55.0 (12.8)	54.0 (12.2)	42.8 (6.0)	30.9 (−0.6)	19.8 (−6.8)	10.2 (−12.1)	31.3 (−0.4)
Mean monthly sunshine hours	181.7	183.2	216.2	239.8	284.4	317.2	349.6	325.4	264.0	232.5	175.0	163.0	2,932
Percentage possible sunshine	62	62	58	60	63	69	75	75	70	68	60	58	66
Source: NOAA (relative humidity and dew point 1976–1990, sun 1961–1990)

== Demographics ==
Historical population
Census	Pop.	Note	%±
1900	811		—
1910	1,098		35.4%
1920	1,596		45.4%
1930	1,672		4.8%
1940	2,188		30.9%
1950	2,700		23.4%
1960	2,875		6.5%
1970	2,662		−7.4%
1980	2,829		6.3%
1990	2,826		−0.1%
2000	2,820		−0.2%
2010	2,737		−2.9%
2020	2,633		−3.8%
U.S. Decennial Census; 2012 Estimate

=== 2020 census ===
As of the 2020 census, Valentine had a population of 2,633. The median age was 42.2 years. 22.1% of residents were under the age of 18 and 24.4% of residents were 65 years of age or older. For every 100 females there were 92.3 males, and for every 100 females age 18 and over there were 92.1 males age 18 and over.

0.0% of residents lived in urban areas, while 100.0% lived in rural areas.

There were 1,217 households in Valentine, of which 25.9% had children under the age of 18 living in them. Of all households, 42.6% were married-couple households, 22.0% were households with a male householder and no spouse or partner present, and 30.2% were households with a female householder and no spouse or partner present. About 40.4% of all households were made up of individuals and 19.6% had someone living alone who was 65 years of age or older.

There were 1,447 housing units, of which 15.9% were vacant. The homeowner vacancy rate was 2.4% and the rental vacancy rate was 16.3%.

Racial composition as of the 2020 census
Race	Number	Percent
White	2,198	83.5%
Black or African American	9	0.3%
American Indian and Alaska Native	234	8.9%
Asian	5	0.2%
Native Hawaiian and Other Pacific Islander	0	0.0%
Some other race	15	0.6%
Two or more races	172	6.5%
Hispanic or Latino (of any race)	80	3.0%

=== 2010 census ===
As of the census of 2010, there were 2,737 people, 1,259 households, and 719 families living in the city. The population density was 1,232.9 inhabitants per square mile (476.0/km^{2}). There were 1,430 housing units at an average density of 644.1 per square mile (248.7/km^{2}). The racial makeup of the city was 86.3% White, 0.1% African American, 9.1% Native American, 0.5% Asian, 0.7% from other races, and 3.3% from two or more races. Hispanic or Latino of any race were 1.6% of the population.

There were 1,259 households, of which 24.5% had children under the age of 18 living with them, 43.6% were married couples living together, 10.0% had a female householder with no husband present, 3.5% had a male householder with no wife present, and 42.9% were non-families. 38.6% of all households were made up of individuals, and 18.6% had someone living alone who was 65 years of age or older. The average household size was 2.13 and the average family size was 2.78.

The median age in the city was 46 years. 21.3% of residents were under the age of 18; 6.3% were between the ages of 18 and 24; 21.2% were from 25 to 44; 27.2% were from 45 to 64; and 24% were 65 years of age or older. The gender makeup of the city was 47.2% male and 52.8% female.

=== 2000 census ===
As of the census of 2000, there were 2,820 people, 1,209 households, and 733 families living in the city. The population density was 1,401.1 inhabitants per square mile (541.0/km^{2}). There were 1,373 housing units at an average density of 682.2 per square mile (263.4/km^{2}). The racial makeup of the city was 92.20% White, 0.04% African American, 5.78% Native American, 0.57% Asian, 0.21% from other races, and 1.21% from two or more races. Hispanic or Latino of any race were 0.89% of the population.

There were 1,209 households, out of which 28.6% had children under the age of 18 living with them, 47.8% were married couples living together, 9.9% had a female householder with no husband present, and 39.3% were non-families. 36.1% of all households were made up of individuals, and 17.8% had someone living alone who was 65 years of age or older. The average household size was 2.27 and the average family size was 2.95.

In the city, the population was spread out, with 26.0% under the age of 18, 6.7% from 18 to 24, 24.0% from 25 to 44, 21.8% from 45 to 64, and 21.6% who were 65 years of age or older. The median age was 40 years. For every 100 females, there were 87.1 males. For every 100 females age 18 and over, there were 80.8 males.

The median income for a household in the city was $47,639, and the median income for a family was $52,632. Males had a median income of $38,188 versus $24,636 for females. The per capita income for the city was $22,715. About 1.6% of families and 6.4% of the population were below the poverty line, including 0% of those under age 18 and 16.0% of those age 65 or over.

== Education ==
Valentine is in Valentine Community Schools.

Valentine City Schools was the school district until it merged into Valentine Community Schools in 2006.

Schools include:

- Valentine Elementary School
- Valentine Middle School
- Valentine High School

Private schools:

- Grace Lutheran School
- Zion Lutheran School

== Transportation ==
Valentine Bike Share operates a bikeshare station along the Cowboy Trail. Open Plains Transit provides dial-a-ride transit service on weekdays.

== Notable people ==
- Lyman Lloyd Bryson, CBS Radio broadcaster and American educator. Bryson moderated CBS Radio's The American School of the Air during the 1940s.
- Edward Day Cohota was a Chinese-born and ethnic Chinese veteran who fought in the American Civil War and later served thirty years in the Army.
- James Dahlman was mayor of Omaha from 1906 to 1930.
- Clayton Danks, model of the Wyoming state symbol of the cowboy on a bucking horse, homesteaded near Valentine.
- Patrick Deuel was formerly among the world's heaviest people.
- Rebecca Donaldson, fictional character on Full House, states that her hometown was Valentine.
- Deb Fischer, U.S. Senator, operates a ranch near Valentine.
- Leta Stetter Hollingworth, graduated from Valentine High School in 1902, child psychologist, educator and feminist, married to Harry L. Hollingworth.
- Tim Walz, Governor of Minnesota, former U.S. Representative and 2024 Democratic nominee for Vice President.

== Culture ==
In 2011/2012, an independent feature film, The Aviation Cocktail, had its principal photography in Valentine.
