= Smith Falls =

Waterfall in Nebraska, U.S.

Smith Falls State Park
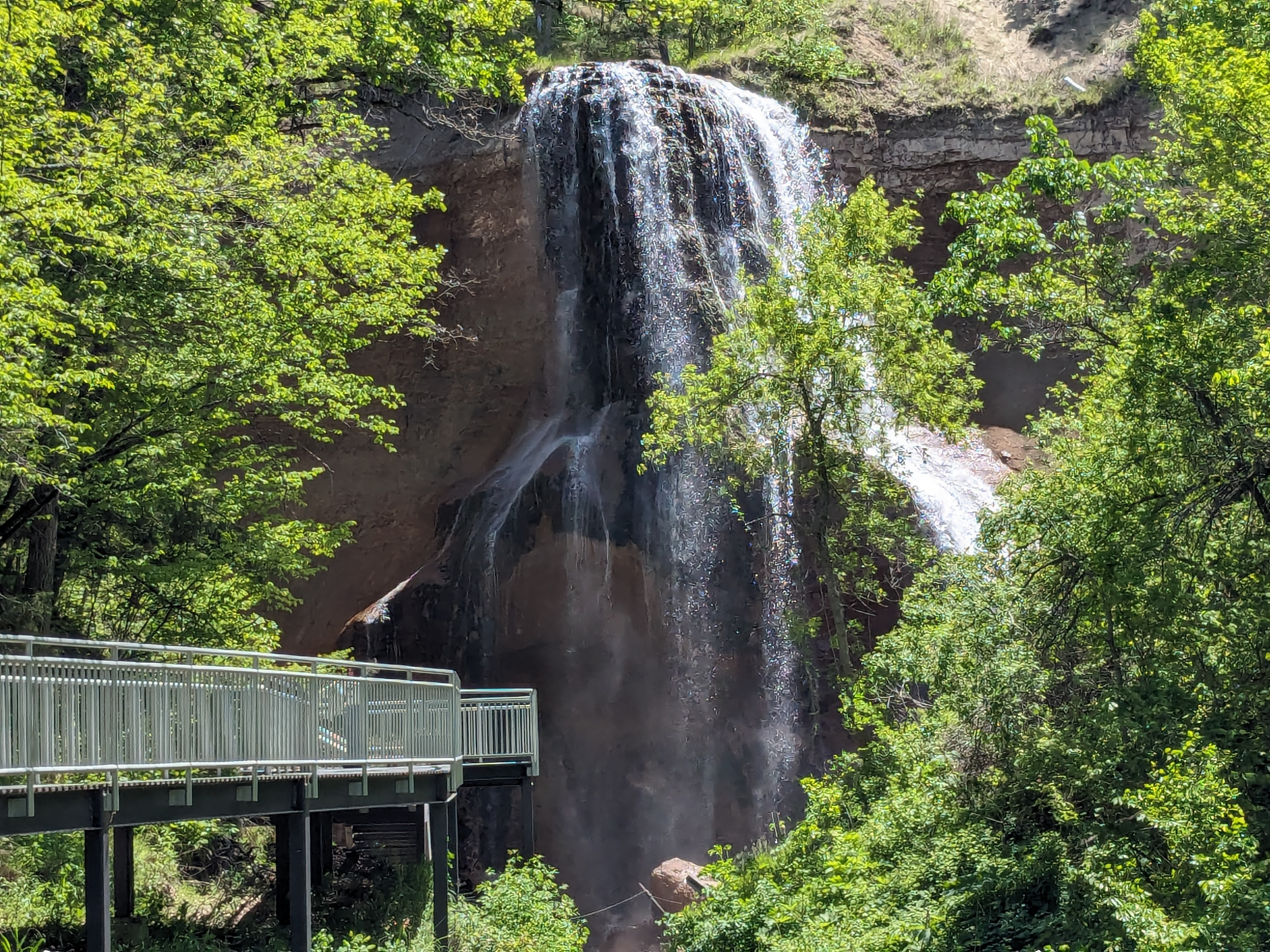

- Location within Nebraska
- Location: Cherry County, Nebraska, United States
- Nearest city: Valentine, Nebraska
- Coordinates: 42°53′16″N 100°18′56″W
- Area: 265.5 acres (107.4 ha)
- Elevation: 2,333 ft (711 m)
- Established: 1992
- Administrator: Nebraska Game and Parks Commission
- Designation: Nebraska state park
- Named for: Orrin B. Smith
- Website: Smith Falls State Park
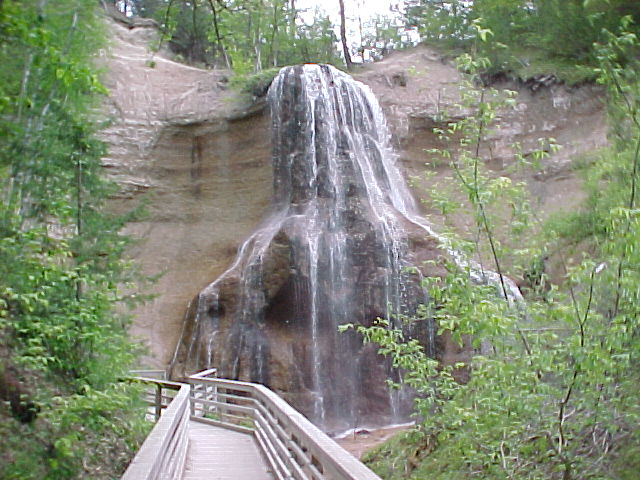
- Smith Falls
- Interactive map of Smith Falls
- Location: Cherry County, Nebraska
- Type: Cascade
- Elevation: 2333
- Total height: 63 feet (19 m)

Smith Falls, at 63 feet (19 m), is the highest waterfall in the state of Nebraska and the centerpiece of Smith Falls State Park. The state park and falls are located 12 miles (19 km) east-northeast of Valentine and 3 miles southwest of Sparks, on the south side of the Niobrara River. Access to the falls is via a footbridge across the river from the north side of the park.

== History ==
First known as Arikaree Falls, the waterfall bears the name of Orrin B. Smith, a pioneer in the Seven Creeks area (1885 State Census). His step-son, Frederick Smith will later file for a homestead claim 5 Sept. 1889 on the south side of the river in Section 30. The site was subsequently owned by Fred Krzyzanowski, who purchased it in 1941, adding a picnic area and campground to capitalize on its popularity among tourists. The Nebraska Game and Parks Commission established the 250-acre (100 ha) Smith Falls State Park through a lease agreement with Krzyzanowski family in 1992. A new 25-year lease was signed in 2018.

Footbridge

In 1996, the historic Verdigre bridge was moved to the park and reconfigured as a footbridge spanning the Niobrara River. The bridge had been previously located at the mouth of Verdigre Creek, then had been moved to carry traffic on Highway 14 in the village of Verdigre, before being dismantled in 1991, then reassembled as a restored 160-foot-long iron truss span at the park in 1996.

== Natural history ==
The falls are on a short spring-fed stream that plunges into a small canyon on the south side of the Niobrara. As the canyon is narrow and sheltered from direct sunlight, it is much cooler than the surrounding landscape; this allows a unique set of flora to grow that is atypical for the Sand Hills of Nebraska. The canyon is home to paper birch and an endemic hybrid grove of quaking aspen and bigtooth aspen.

During the Wisconsin glaciation that ended around 10,000 years ago, north-central Nebraska was much cooler than it is today. The ice age climate supported boreal forest trees like birches, spruces, and aspens, all of which currently predominate in Canada. As the glaciers retreated, so did the boreal forest, which is ill-suited for hot, dry summers. However, the cool canyons along the Niobrara sheltered some of these trees.

The spruce trees did not survive in Nebraska; the nearest extant population is in the Black Hills of South Dakota. A small population of paper birches and aspens survive, protected by the cool microclimates of the small canyons that feed into the Niobrara River. The continued survival of these trees is threatened by warming temperatures. The paper birch population around Smith Falls is not currently reproducing, and may soon die out.

== Activities and amenities ==
The park offers tent camping, canoeing, fishing, hiking, and picnicking facilities.

== See also ==
- List of waterfalls
