= Merritt Dam =

Dam in Cherry County, Nebraska

Merritt Reservoir State Recreation Area
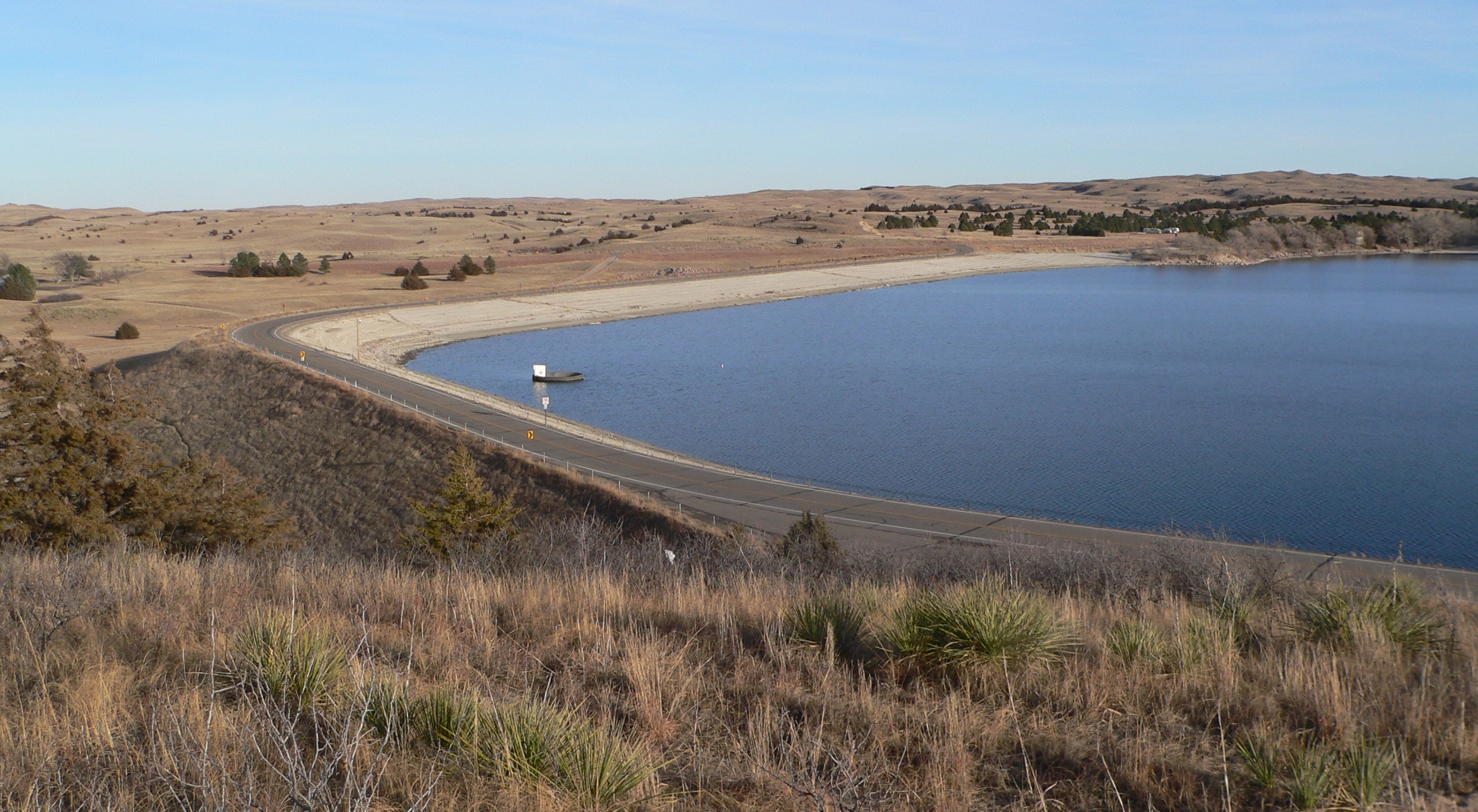
- Merritt Dam, seen from the west

- Location within Nebraska Location within the United States
- Location: Cherry, Nebraska, United States
- Nearest city: Valentine, Nebraska
- Coordinates: 42.60823155°N 100.87786456°W
- Area: 823 acres (333 ha)
- Designation: Nebraska state recreation area
- Governing body: Nebraska Game and Parks Commission

Merritt Dam is a dam in Cherry County, Nebraska, southwest of Valentine, in the north-central part of the state. The 126-foot (38 m) earthen dam impounds the Snake River as it flows along the southern edge of the Samuel R. McKelvie National Forest in the Sandhills. It created Merritt Reservoir in 1964 as a project of the United States Bureau of Reclamation. The reservoir holds almost 75,000 acre⋅ft (93,000,000 m^{3}), with about 44 miles (71 km) of sandy shoreline and 3,000 surface acres (1,200 ha) of water.

Merritt Reservoir State Recreation Area is adjacent to the eastern side of the reservoir and offers boating, fishing, camping, and hunting activities. The area, a noted dark-sky location, is the location of the annual Nebraska Star Party.
