= Meadville, Nebraska =

Unincorporated community in Nebraska, United States

- Unincorporated community
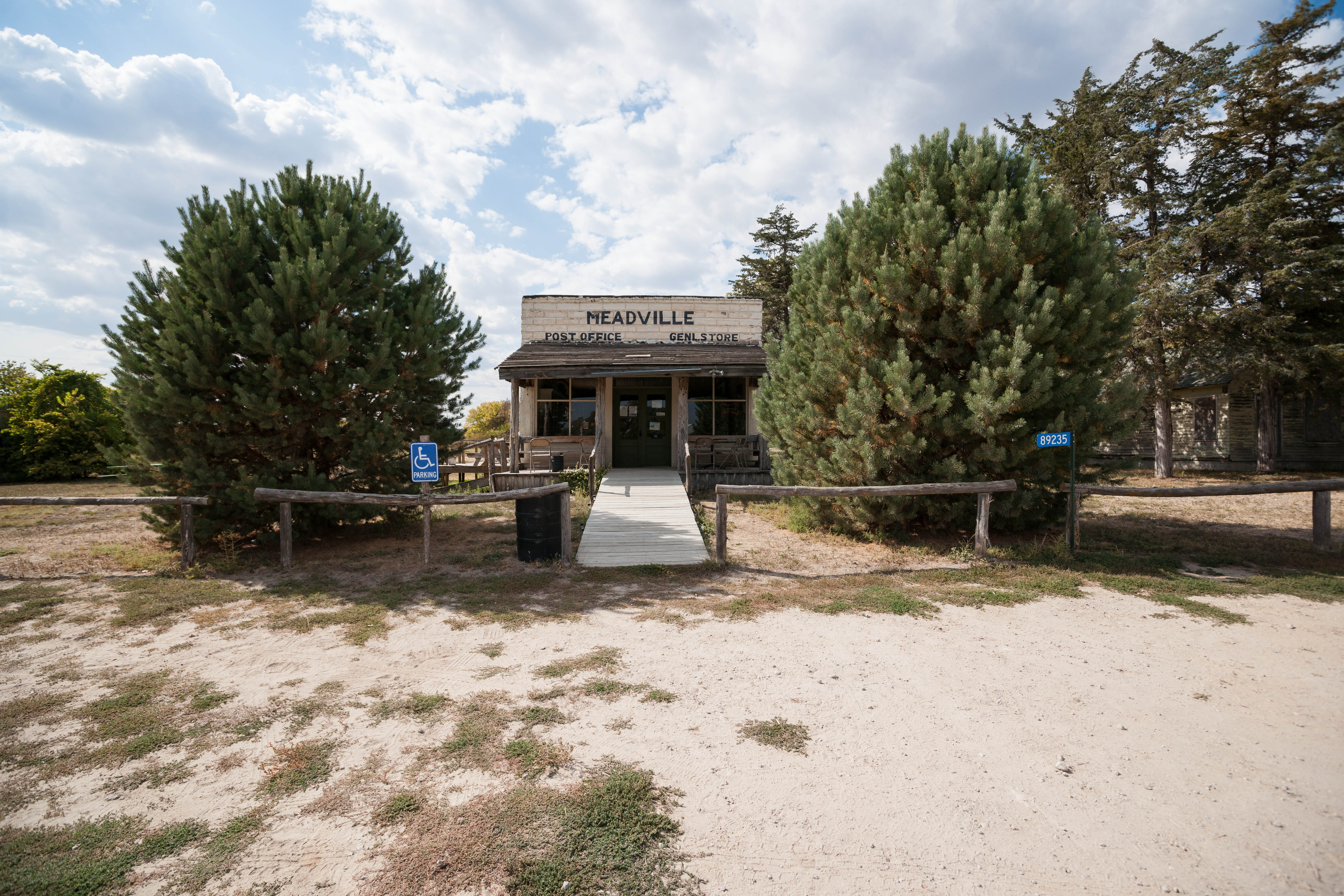
- Historical Post Office and General Store in Meadville

- Location within Nebraska Location within the United States
- Coordinates: 42°45′32″N 99°50′56″W
- Country: United States
- State: Nebraska
- County: Keya Paha
- Elevation: 2,054 ft (626 m)
- Time zone: UTC-6 (Central (CST))
  - Summer (DST): UTC-5 (CDT)
- ZIP code: 68778
- FIPS code: 31-31475
- GNIS feature ID: 831181

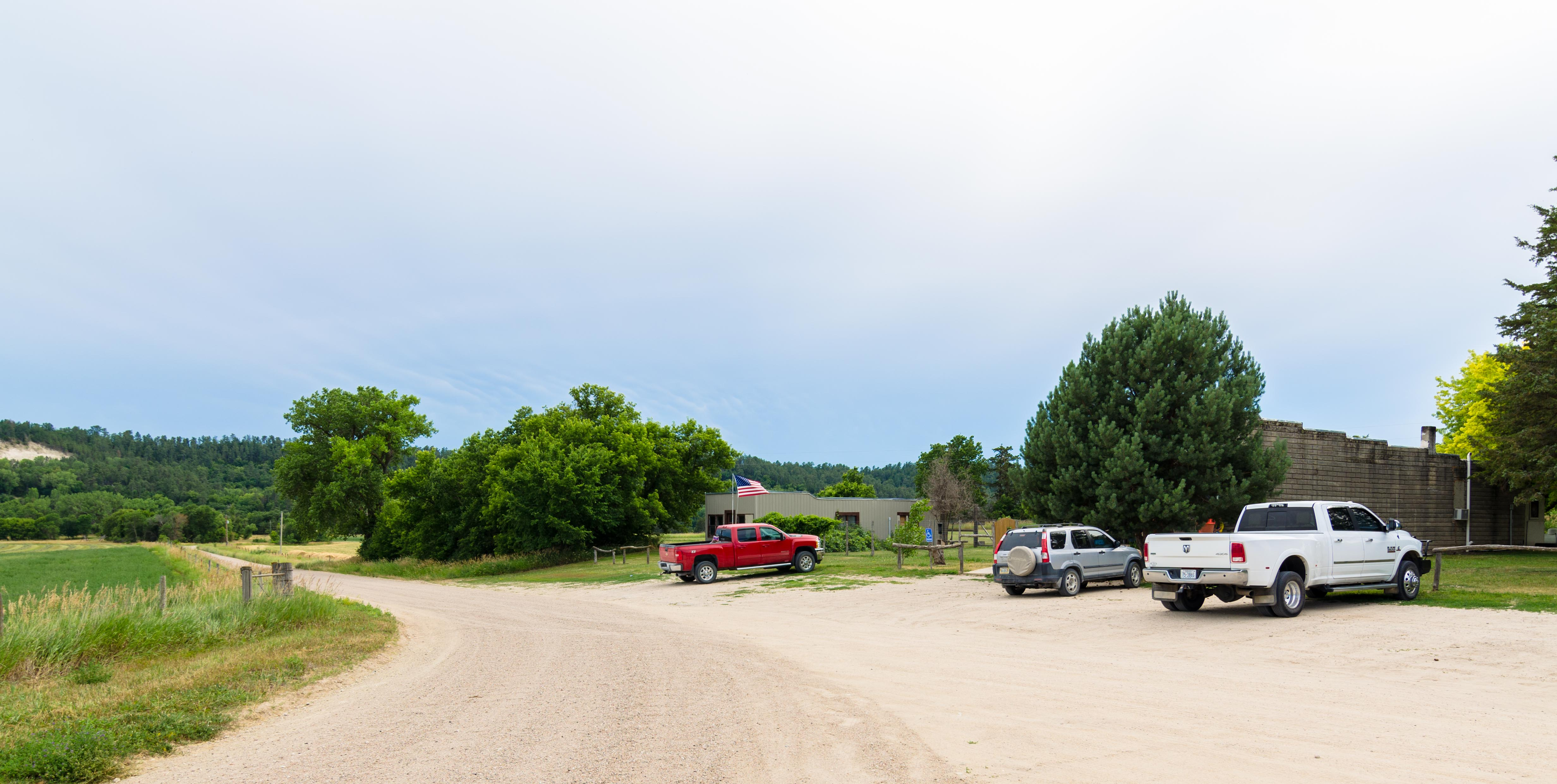
Meadville, NE

Meadville is an unincorporated community in Keya Paha County, Nebraska, United States.

== History ==
A post office was established at Meadville in 1883. The first postmaster was Merrit I. Mead, who gave the town his name.
