= Sparta, Nebraska =

Unincorporated community in Nebraska, U.S.

Coordinates: 42°39′19″N 97°58′25″W

Sparta is an unincorporated community in Knox County, Nebraska, United States.

== History ==
A post office was established at Sparta in 1880, and remained in operation until it was discontinued in 1912. The community was likely named after Sparta, Wisconsin.
