= North Branch Verdigre Creek =

Stream in Nebraska, USA

North Branch Verdigre Creek Tributary to Verdigre Creek
- Location of North Branch Verdigre Creek mouth North Branch Verdigre Creek (the United States)

Location
- Country: United States
- State: Nebraska
- County: Knox; Holt

Physical characteristics
- Source: Elkhorn River divide
  - location: about 4 miles [convert] southeast of Opportunity, Nebraska
  - coordinates: 42°30′38.01″N 098°24′41.29″W
  - elevation: 1,880 ft (570 m)
- Mouth: Verdigre Creek
  - location: about 1 mile southwest of Verdigre, Nebraska
  - coordinates: 42°34′40.01″N 098°03′35.26″W
  - elevation: 1,368 ft (417 m)
- Length: 27.96 mi (45.00 km)
- Basin size: 111.24 square miles (288.1 km^{2})
- Discharge
  - location: Verdigre Creek
  - average: 12.06 cu ft/s (0.342 m^{3}/s) at mouth with Verdigre Creek

Basin features
- Progression: Verdigre Creek → Niobrara River → Missouri River → Mississippi River → Gulf of Mexico
- River system: Niobrara
- Bridges: 878th Road, 570th Avenue, 508th Avenue, 881st Road, 510th Avenue, 512th Avenue, 514th Avenue, 881 Road

North Branch Verdigre Creek is a 27.96 mi (45.00 km) long second-order tributary to Verdigre Creek in Knox County, Nebraska.

== Course ==
North Branch Verdigre Creek rises on the Elkhorn River divide about 4 miles southeast of Opportunity, Nebraska in Holt County and then flows northeast into Knox County and then east-southeast to join Verdigre Creek about 1 mile southwest of Verdigre, Nebraska.

== Watershed ==
North Branch Verdigre Creek drains 111.24 square miles (288.1 km^{2}) of area, receives about 25.3 in/year of precipitation, has a wetness index of 603.97, and is about 4.23% forested.

== See also ==
- List of rivers of Nebraska
