= Pishelville, Nebraska =

Unincorporated community in Nebraska, U.S.

Coordinates: 42°43′37″N 98°12′44″W

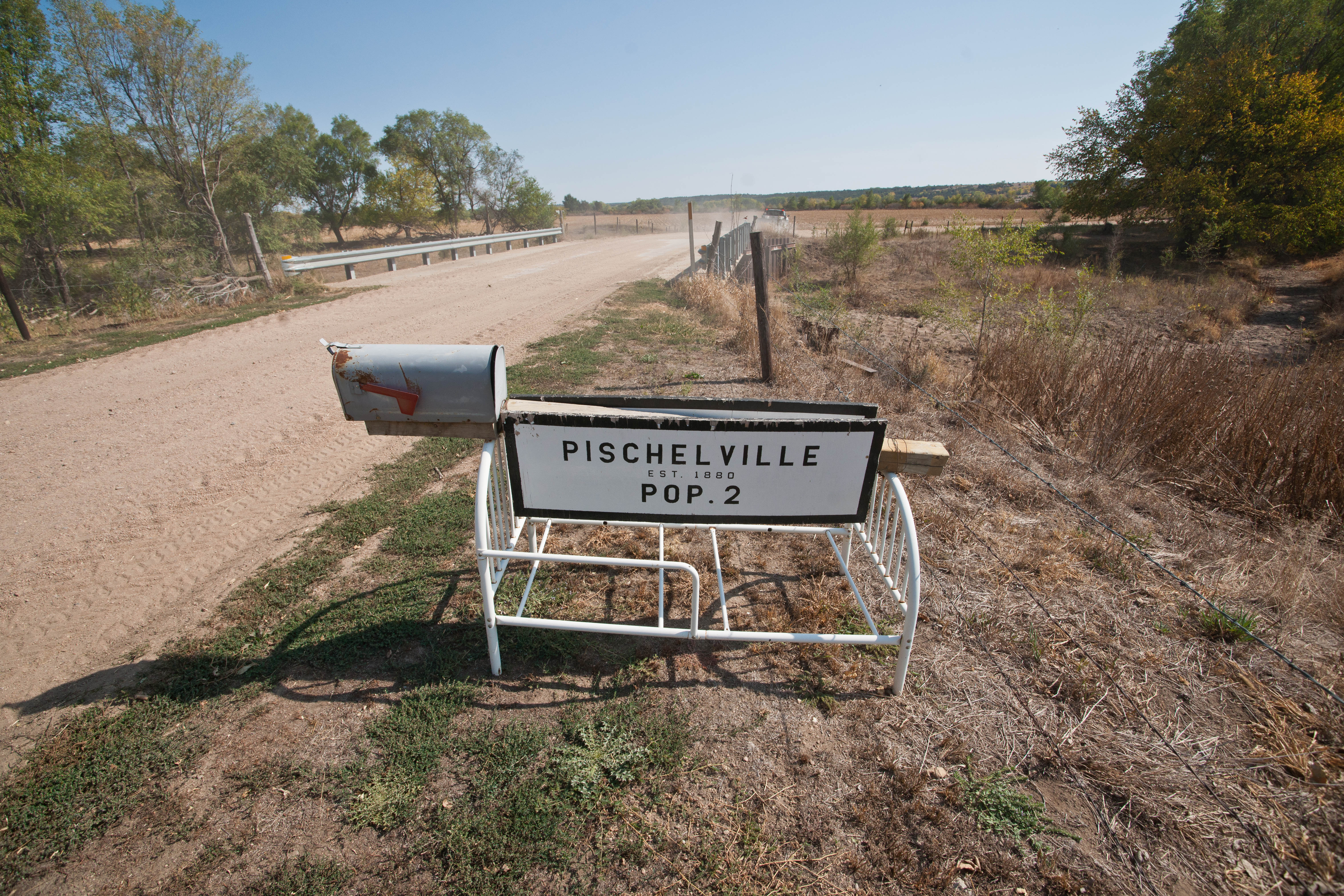
Sign for Pishelville spelling the town name as "Pischelville", 2012

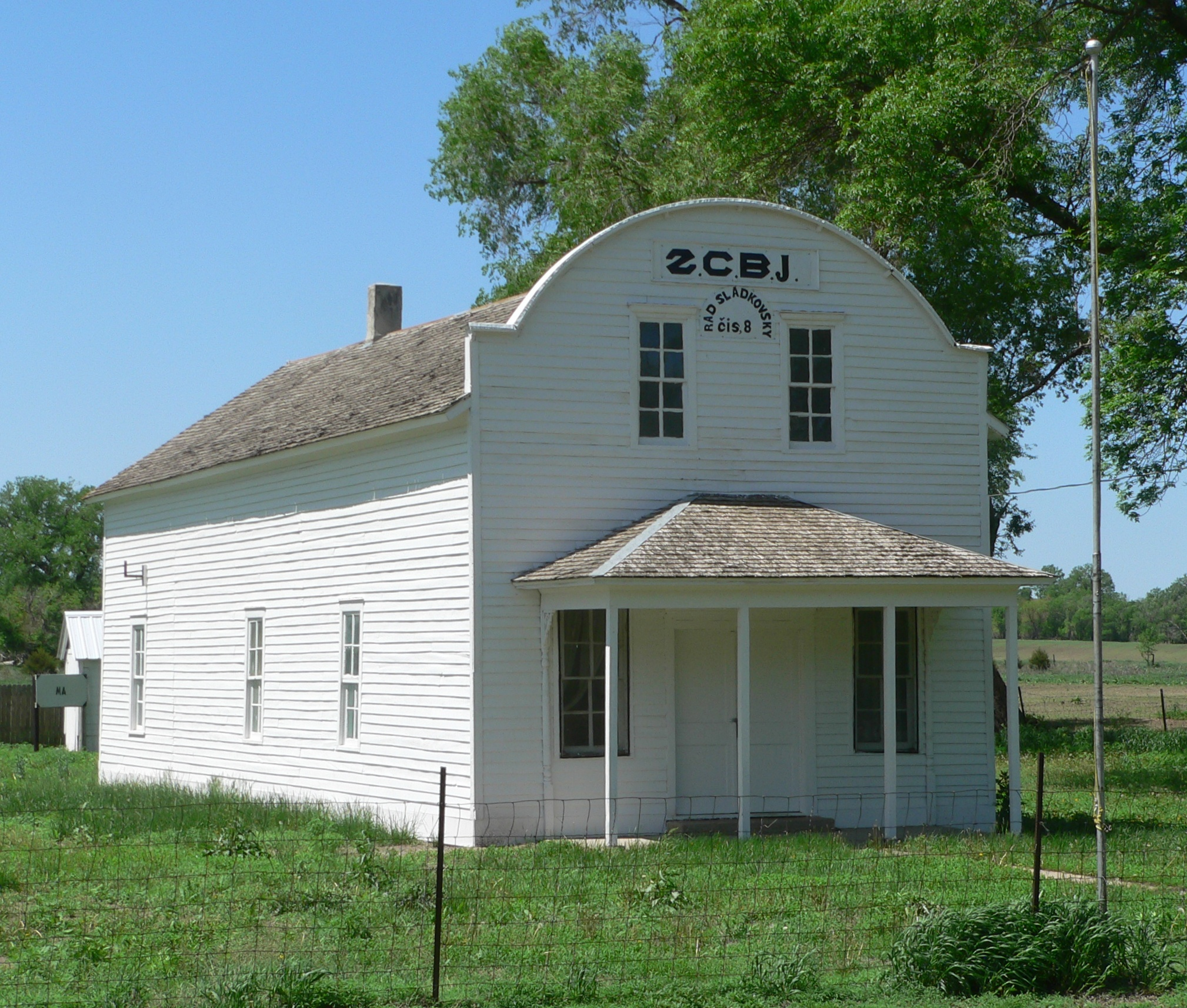
A Western Fraternal Life Association meeting hall in Pishelville, seen in 2013

Pishelville is an unincorporated community in Knox County, Nebraska, United States.

== History ==
A post office was established at Pishelville in 1874, and remained in operation until it was discontinued in 1927. The town was founded by Anton Pischel, and named for him.
