= National Register of Historic Places listings in Cherry County, Nebraska =

Location of Cherry County in Nebraska

Cherry County, Nebraska, United States, has 13 properties and districts listed on the National Register of Historic Places and one former listing.

The locations of National Register properties and districts for which the latitude and longitude coordinates are included below, may be seen in a map.

This National Park Service list is complete through NPS recent listings posted October 30, 2026.

== Current listings ==
	Name on the Register	Image	Date listed	Location	City or town	Description
1	Bell Bridge	Bell Bridge	June 29, 1992 (#92000752)	County road over the Niobrara River, 11.9 miles northeast of Valentine; 42°53′42″N 100°19′20″W	Valentine	Bridge built in 1903; one of oldest surviving Pratt through truss bridges in Cherry County and the state; one of only four bridges in the county surviving ice melt flood of 1916.
2	Berry State Aid Bridge	Berry State Aid Bridge	June 29, 1992 (#92000753)	County road over the Niobrara River, 10 miles northeast of Valentine; 42°54′07″N 100°21′44″W	Valentine	Built 1920-21, replacing one of the four that survived.
3	Borman Bridge	Borman Bridge	June 29, 1992 (#92000751)	County road over the Niobrara River, 2.3 miles southeast of Valentine; 42°51′07″N 100°31′15″W	Valentine	Pinned Pratt through truss 1916 replacement for one of the bridges that was destroyed in the flood.
4	Brewer Bridge	Brewer Bridge	June 29, 1992 (#92000754)	County road over the Niobrara River, 14.7 miles east of Valentine; 42°52′34″N 100°15′58″W	Valentine	
5	Bryan Bridge	Bryan Bridge	June 23, 1988 (#88000912)	U.S. Route 20; 42°49′56″N 100°31′41″W	Valentine	
6	Cherry County Courthouse	Cherry County Courthouse	January 10, 1990 (#89002229)	4th and Main Sts. 42°52′34″N 100°33′04″W	Valentine	
7	County Line Bridge	County Line Bridge	July 13, 2018 (#100002660)	Private Rd. over Niobrara R. 42°50′49″N 100°12′02″W	Valentine vicinity	
8	Dry Valley Church and Cemetery	Dry Valley Church and Cemetery	July 3, 2007 (#07000660)	West of Nebraska Highway 97 north of Mullen; 42°15′50″N 101°05′10″W	Mullen	
9	Spade Ranch	Spade Ranch	February 28, 1980 (#80002464)	Northwest of Ellsworth; 42°18′23″N 102°04′47″W	Ellsworth	
10	Twin Bridge	Twin Bridge	June 29, 1992 (#92000750)	North Loup River, 7.9 miles northwest of Brownlee; 42°20′00″N 100°45′45″W	Brownlee	
11	US Post Office-Valentine	US Post Office-Valentine	December 13, 1991 (#91001750)	348 N. Main St. 42°52′32″N 100°33′01″W	Valentine	One of 12 Nebraska post offices featuring a Section of Fine Arts mural. The $700 mural in the post office was both praised and panned when it was originally produced. Now the Valentine Media Center, operated by Educational Service Unit #17.
12	Valentine Public School	Valentine Public School	June 14, 1984 (#84002454)	3rd and Macomb Sts. 42°52′31″N 100°32′49″W	Valentine	Now operated as a museum.
13	F.M. Walcott House	F.M. Walcott House	October 7, 1982 (#82000599)	431 N. Hall St. 42°52′40″N 100°32′58″W	Valentine	Deemed locally significant architecturally "as an example of a vernacular Neo-Classical Revival dwelling, based upon earlier upright-with-wing or templeform houses common to the Greek Revival style in the eastern and midwestern states" and for association with F. M. Walcott, a county attorney and county judge who had one of the largest legal practices in Nebraska.

== Former listings ==
	Name on the Register	Image	Date listed	Date removed	Location	City or town	Description
1	Adamson Bridge	Adamson Bridge	June 29, 1992 (#92000749)	March 25, 2019	Nebraska Highway 97 over the Niobrara River, 7.8 miles southwest of Valentine; 42°48′26″N 100°40′20″W	Valentine	Located on a different road alignment than the current crossing (a concrete beam bridge built c. 1994), this bridge seems to be gone based on aerial photo view of its coordinates and on photos taken at the site in 2014.

== See also ==
- List of National Historic Landmarks in Nebraska
- National Register of Historic Places listings in Nebraska
