= Fort Niobrara (disambiguation) =

Fort Niobrara was a military installation in the U.S. state of Nebraska.

Fort Niobrara may also refer to

- Fort Niobrara National Wildlife Refuge in Nebraska
- Fort Niobrara Wilderness, within the wildlife refuge
