= Conterra, Nebraska =

Unincorporated community in Nebraska, United States

- Unincorporated Community
- Location within Nebraska Location within the United States
- Coordinates: 42.4°N 100.6°W
- Country: United States
- State: Nebraska
- County: Cherry

Conterra is an unincorporated community in Cherry County, Nebraska, United States. It is located at latitude 42.448 and longitude -100.63.

== History ==
A post office was established at Conterra in 1913, and remained in operation until it was discontinued in 1934.
