= Twin Bridge (Brownlee, Nebraska) =

- U.S. National Register of Historic Places
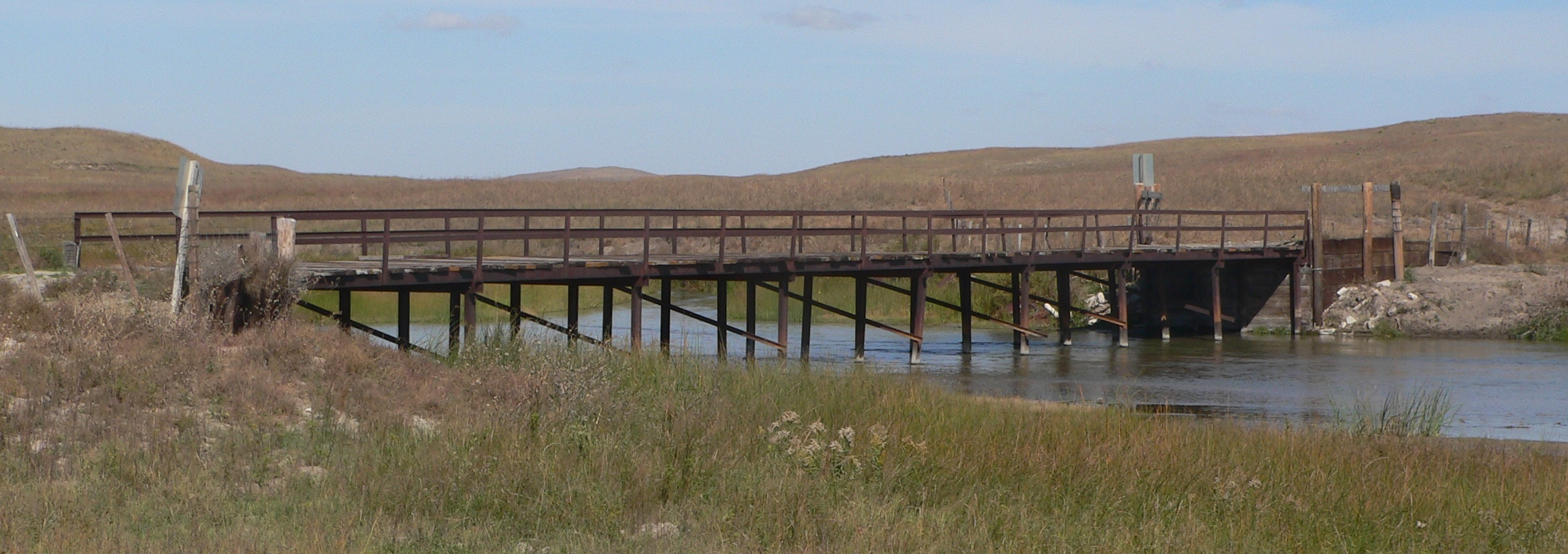
- View from the south bank, facing upstream

- Location within Nebraska Location within the United States
- Nearest city: Brownlee, Nebraska
- Coordinates: 42°20′0″N 100°45′44.67″W
- Area: less than one acre
- Built: 1900
- Built by: Wrought Iron Bridge Co.
- Architectural style: Steel stringer bridge
- MPS: Highway Bridges in Nebraska MPS
- NRHP reference No.: 92000750
- Added to NRHP: June 29, 1992

The Twin Bridge near Brownlee, Nebraska is a steel stringer bridge with a timber roadbed that was built in 1900 by the Wrought Iron Bridge Co. of Canton, Ohio. Also known as the North Loup River Bridge and denoted as NEHBS No. CE00-223, it was listed on the National Register of Historic Places in 1992.

It brings a Cherry County road over the North Loup River, 7.9 miles northwest of Brownlee.
