= County Line Bridge (Cherry County, Nebraska) =

- U.S. National Register of Historic Places
- Location within Nebraska Location within the United States
- Location: Private Rd. over Niobrara River, near Valentine, Nebraska
- Coordinates: 42°50′49″N 100°12′02″W
- Built: 1916
- MPS: Highway Bridges in Nebraska MPS
- NRHP reference No.: 100002660
- Added to NRHP: July 13, 2018

The County Line Bridge spanning the Niobrara River about 17.5 miles (28.2 km) east of Valentine, Nebraska was listed on the National Register of Historic Places in 2018.

It is a truss bridge built in 1916 after spring flooding destroyed 15 bridges along the river.

It was deemed "'significant at the local level for its contribution to engineering as a well-preserved example of a once common bridge type'" according to History Nebraska.

It is one of 15 bridges, five of which were already listed on the National Register of Historic Places, spanning the section of the river which is designated as Niobrara National Scenic River.

It is located within Cherry County, near the borders of Brown County and Key Paha counties.
