= Bowring Ranch State Historical Park =

Park in Nebraska, USA

- Location within Nebraska
- Location: Cherry County, Nebraska, United States
- Nearest town: Merriman, Nebraska
- Coordinates: 42°57′28″N 101°40′38″W
- Area: 435 acres (176 ha)
- Elevation: 3,258 ft (993 m)
- Designation: Nebraska state historical park
- Established: 1987
- Named for: Arthur Bowring
- Administrator: Nebraska Game and Parks Commission
- Website: Bowring Ranch State Historical Park

Bowring Ranch State Historical Park is a state park of Nebraska, United States, interpreting the ranching heritage of the Sand Hills region and the lives of former owners Arthur and Eva Bowring (the first female U.S. Senator from Nebraska). The park is three miles (4.8 km) north of Merriman in Cherry County, near the South Dakota border.

The ranch was founded in 1894. Arthur and Eva met when her car broke down near his ranch and he came to her assistance. They married in 1928 and kept the ranch running while each served in a variety of public offices. Eva Bowring maintained ranch operations on her own from Arthur's death in 1944 to her own in 1985. Concerned that it would be fragmented to new owners, the former Senator willed her ranch to the state in memory of her husband. The ranch continues to be operated as a working Hereford cattle ranch. The ranch house and outbuildings have been preserved, and a large visitor center documenting the Bowrings' lives is on the site.
