= Eva Bowring =

American politician (1892–1985)

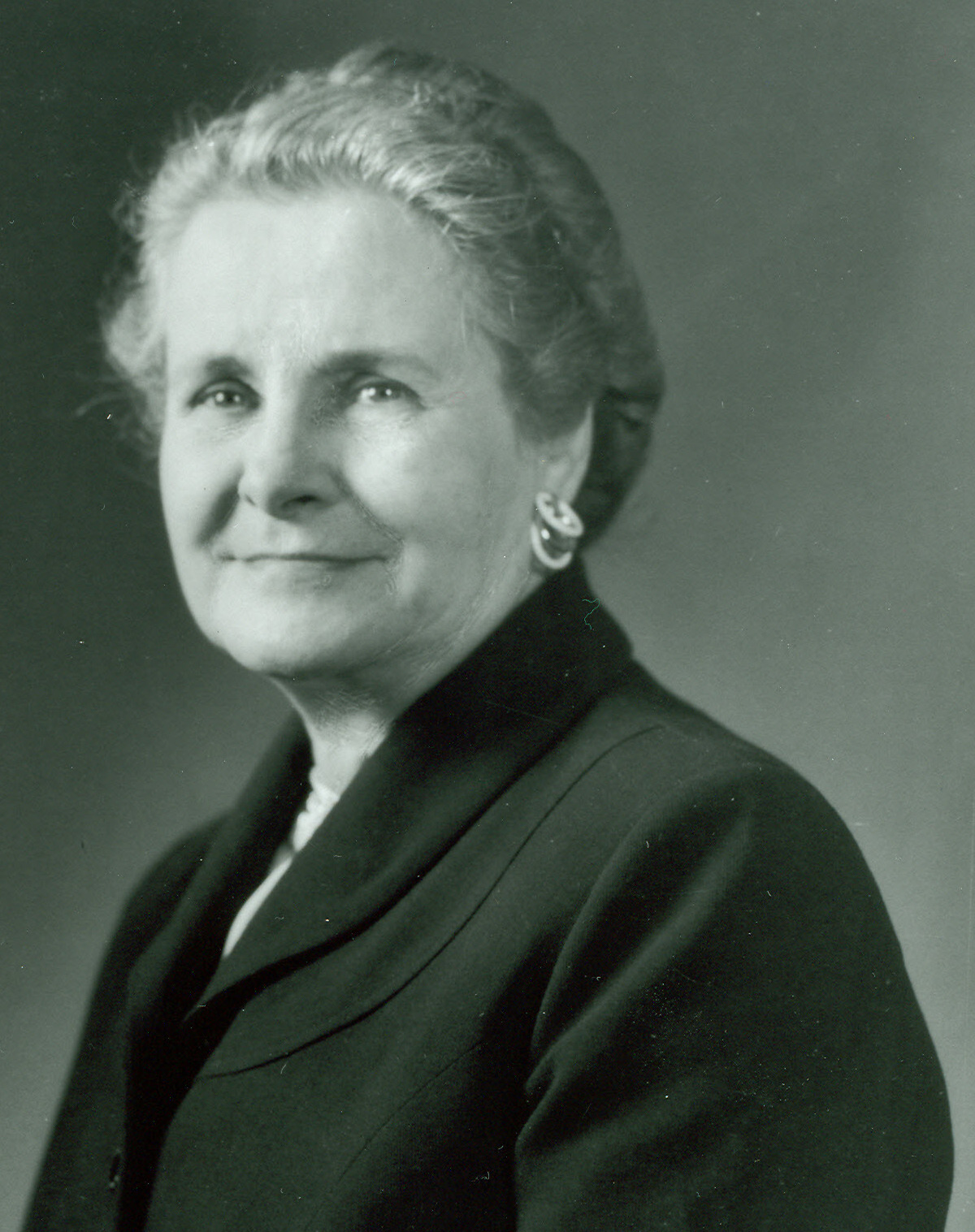

United States Senator from Nebraska
- In office April 16, 1954 – November 7, 1954
- Appointed by: Robert B. Crosby
- Preceded by: Dwight Griswold
- Succeeded by: Hazel Abel

Personal details
- Born: January 9, 1892 Nevada, Missouri, U.S.
- Died: January 8, 1985 (aged 92) Gordon, Nebraska, U.S.
- Party: Republican
- Spouse: Arthur Bowring

Eva Bowring (née Kelly; January 9, 1892 – January 8, 1985) was a U.S. Senator from Nebraska. Bowring was born in Nevada, Missouri. In 1928, she married Arthur Bowring. They made their home at the Bowring Ranch near Merriman in Cherry County, Nebraska.

Bowring was active in Republican politics in Nebraska. She was appointed to the United States Senate by Governor Robert B. Crosby to fill the vacancy caused by the death of Dwight Griswold, making her the first woman to represent Nebraska in the Senate. She served from April 16, 1954, to November 7, 1954. Bowring was the fourth of six Senators to serve during the fifteenth Senate term for Nebraska's Class 2 seat, from January 3, 1949, to January 3, 1955.

After her service in the Senate, Bowring continued ranching near Merriman. She served part-time on the Board of Parole of the Department of Justice from 1956 to 1964. She died in 1985, only one day before her 93rd birthday. After her death, Bowring Ranch was donated to the Nebraska Game and Parks Commission, becoming Bowring Ranch State Historical Park.

== See also ==
- Women in the United States Senate

U.S. Senate
Preceded by Dwight Griswold	United States Senator (Class 2) from Nebraska; 1954; Served alongside: Hugh Butler, Samuel Reynolds	Succeeded by Hazel Abel
