= Sparks, Nebraska =

- Unincorporated community
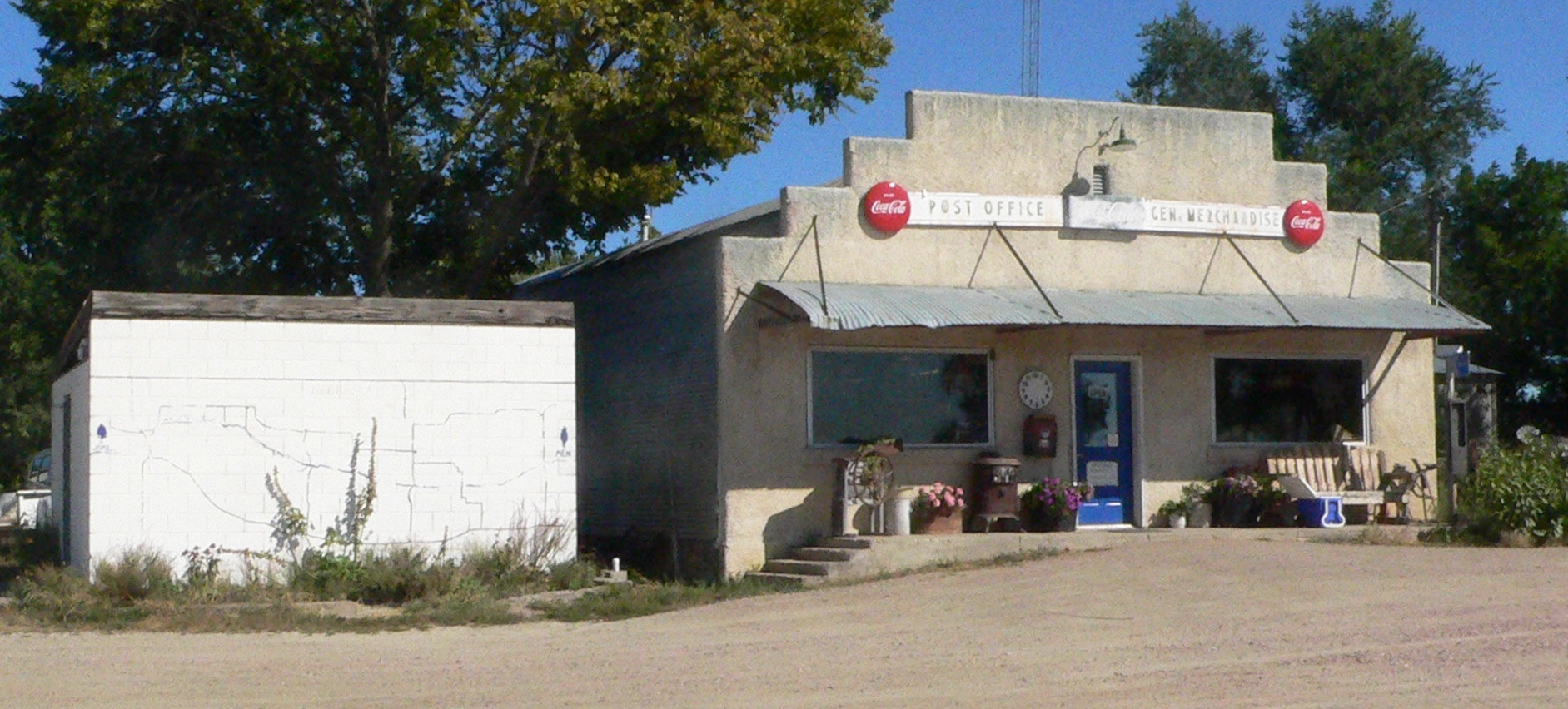
- Post office and general store in Sparks

- Location within the state of Nebraska
- Coordinates: 42°56′28″N 100°15′21″W
- Country: United States
- State: Nebraska
- County: Cherry
- Elevation: 2,602 ft (793 m)

Population (2000)
  - Total: 3
- Time zone: UTC-6 (Central (CST))
  - Summer (DST): UTC-5 (CDT)
- ZIP codes: 69220
- GNIS feature ID: 833641

Sparks is an unincorporated community in Cherry County, Nebraska, United States. Its elevation is 2,602 feet (793 m). Sparks has a post office with the ZIP code 69220.

Businesses in the village include an outfitting company, Dryland Aquatics, that has served visitors to the nearby Niobrara River since 1980, Sparks Store, which houses the post office and Dryland Aquatics, and the Sparks Museum of History. Smith Falls is southwest of Sparks.

== History ==
Sparks was named for Eldon and Joseph A. Sparks, who purchased the land from the original pioneer James Hudson, who arrived in March 1884 and filed a Homestead Entry. He commuted this to a preemption (paid $200) and sold it to the Sparks brothers on October 5, 1887, for $1000. The Sparks brothers, Valentine bankers, were speculating in land, believing a rail line would eventually run northeast from Valentine, which never took place.

Prior to their purchase, the area was known as the Hudson corner, for the extended family of James Hudson, who had homesteads nearby. From the Democratic Blade of December 8, 1887: "John Hudson, G.H. Sawyer, and Mr.Brewer were in town today as a committee to make arrangements about having a new town platted on the table near James Hudson. The new town is to be called Sparks, and Harry Holsclaw will survey and plat it on Monday."

The Sparks brothers sold a 10-acre tract on March 12, 1889, to the Sparks Improvement Company, and lots were then offered for sale.

The land north of the river was settled in 1883. It was called Seven Creeks and consisted of the area between the military reservation on the west and the Keya Paha County line to the east. In June 1890, on a motion by Jake Grooms, the area was divided into Sparks and Kewanee precincts, which are the modern names for the two areas.

A post office/store was established at Sparks in 1888 and has operated there continuously since.

In 1888, a church committee was formed, and the foundation was laid. In 1889, the church was completed by the pioneers in the area. Logs were harvested from the Niobrara canyons and milled locally. To celebrate, a gathering was held, called the Harvest Home Celebration. This would later be changed to Old Settlers and continues to this day, making it one of the longest continuous gatherings to honor the pioneer settlers of Nebraska.

The Sparks Church served as a church and community hall. As an early pioneer structure, that remains true to its original construction, it is an important historical landmark.

The Sparks Cemetery is located one-half mile east. Predating the town and church, the cemetery was begun in 1885 when Stella Grooms died. She was a daughter of pioneers John S. and Annie Grooms. The land for the cemetery was donated by the Henry Chaufty family, another Sparks pioneer. The cemetery contains many Sparks area pioneers.

Numerous schools were established in the area as soon as pioneers settled the area in 1883. The first school in the town was begun in December 1892 (Valentine Dem.).

George Sawyer built the first rock store, which housed the post office that was established on March 15, 1888. On March 12, 1889 George Sawyer and J. A. Brewer formed the Sparks Improvement Company. They offered ten-acre tract of lots for sale. The first lot was sold to S. E. Nader on November 13, 1890. The rock store was destroyed in a fire in 1900. Curtis Callen parched the lots in June 1901 and rebuilt the rock store. He also built a house next to the rock store, which is still occupied. In 1908, Peter Simons purchased the store and surrounding properties. In 1920, John and Rose Langer Simons purchased Sparks and ran the store and post office for 25 years. In 1945, Waldo and Nadine Simons bought Sparks. In 1952, the Steel building was built on the west side of the store. This is the store that is still in use. Waldo ran the store for 45 years until Lou and Jan Christiansen of Fremont bought the town of Sparks in 1985. Lou and Jan started Dryland Aquatics in Fremont in 1980. They moved the headquarters to the Sparks General store in 1985 and ran Dryland Aquatics next door to the Post Office. In May 1998, Edward and Louise Egelhoff Heinert bought the Town of Sparks and Dryland Aquatics. In 1998, they added a bunk house that was previously the computer and special needs build for the Valentine elementary school from District 6. It was then moved from Valentine to the east side of Sparks. Later the Sparks School was bought and turned into a bunkhouse. The Heinerts still own Sparks and still operate Dryland Aquatics.
