= Merriman, Nebraska =

- Village
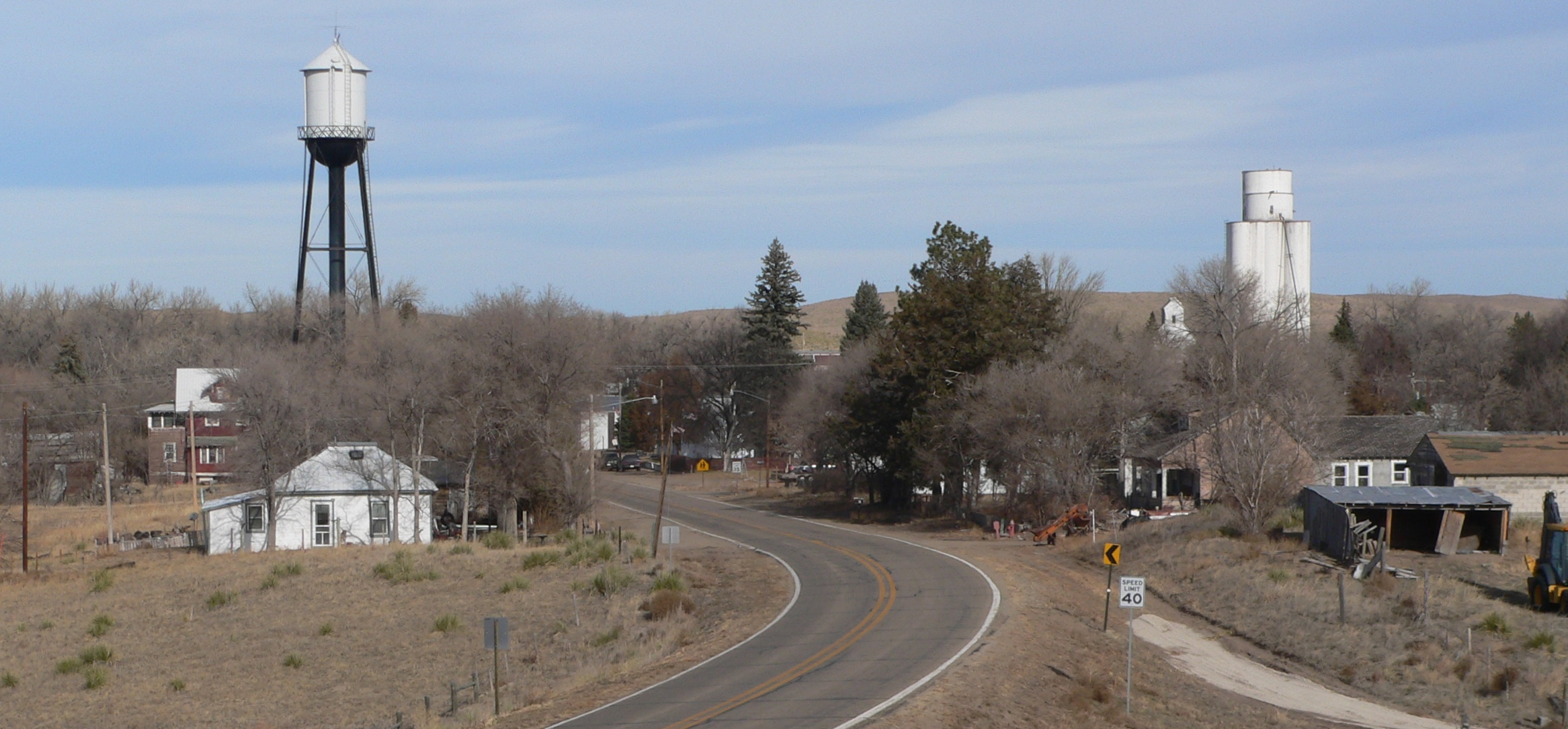
- Merriman, seen from the south along Nebraska Highway 61

- Location of Merriman, Nebraska
- Coordinates: 42°55′23″N 101°41′59″W
- Country: United States
- State: Nebraska
- County: Cherry

Area
  - Total: 1.03 sq mi (2.66 km^{2})
  - Land: 1.03 sq mi (2.66 km^{2})
  - Water: 0 sq mi (0.00 km^{2})
- Elevation: 3,261 ft (994 m)

Population (2020)
  - Total: 87
  - Density: 84.7/sq mi (32.71/km^{2})
- Time zone: UTC-7 (Mountain (MST))
  - Summer (DST): UTC-6 (MDT)
- ZIP code: 69218
- Area code: 308
- FIPS code: 31-31815
- GNIS feature ID: 2399320

Merriman is a village in Cherry County, Nebraska. The population was 87 at the time of the 2020 census.

== History ==
Merriman was established in 1885 when the Fremont, Elkhorn and Missouri Valley Railroad was extended to that point. It was named for J. Merriman, a railroad official.

== Demographics ==
Historical population
Census	Pop.	Note	%±
1910	254		—
1920	346		36.2%
1930	362		4.6%
1940	321		−11.3%
1950	260		−19.0%
1960	285		9.6%
1970	172		−39.6%
1980	159		−7.6%
1990	151		−5.0%
2000	118		−21.9%
2010	128		8.5%
2020	87		−32.0%
U.S. Decennial Census

=== 2010 census ===
As of the census of 2010, there were 128 people, 58 households, and 36 families living in the village. The population density was 124.3 inhabitants per square mile (48.0/km^{2}). There were 68 housing units at an average density of 66.0 per square mile (25.5/km^{2}). The racial makeup of the village was 87.5% White, 1.6% African American, 6.3% Native American, and 4.7% from two or more races. Hispanic or Latino of any race were 0.8% of the population.

There were 58 households, of which 24.1% had children under the age of 18 living with them, 51.7% were married couples living together, 5.2% had a female householder with no husband present, 5.2% had a male householder with no wife present, and 37.9% were non-families. 34.5% of all households were made up of individuals, and 27.6% had someone living alone who was 65 years of age or older. The average household size was 2.21 and the average family size was 2.78.

The median age in the village was 51 years. 22.7% of residents were under the age of 18; 0.8% were between the ages of 18 and 24; 18.8% were from 25 to 44; 26.6% were from 45 to 64; and 31.3% were 65 years of age or older. The gender makeup of the village was 50.8% male and 49.2% female.

=== 2000 census ===
At the 2000 census, there were 118 people, 51 households and 31 families living in the village. The population density was 115.0 inhabitants per square mile (44.4/km^{2}). There were 69 housing units at an average density of 67.3 per square mile (26.0/km^{2}). The racial makeup of the village was 93.22% White, 3.39% Native American, and 3.39% from two or more races.

There were 51 households, of which 29.4% had children under the age of 18 living with them, 51.0% were married couples living together, 5.9% had a female householder with no husband present, and 39.2% were non-families. 35.3% of all households were made up of individuals, and 19.6% had someone living alone who was 65 years of age or older. The average household size was 2.31 and the average family size was 3.00.

27.1% of the population were under the age of 18, 5.1% from 18 to 24, 20.3% from 25 to 44, 25.4% from 45 to 64, and 22.0% who were 65 years of age or older. The median age was 42 years. For every 100 females, there were 93.4 males. For every 100 females age 18 and over, there were 95.5 males.

The median household income was $19,250 and the median family income was $23,750. Males had a median income of $21,875 compared with $13,750 for females. The per capita income for the village was $10,736. There were 26.7% of families and 30.1% of the population living below the poverty line, including 31.4% of under eighteens and 20.0% of those over 64.

== Geography ==
According to the United States Census Bureau, the village has a total area of 1.03 square miles (2.67 km^{2}), all land.

=== Climate ===
The area is characterized by humid continental climate which typically has a large seasonal temperature difference, with warm to hot (and often humid) summers and cold (sometimes severely cold) winters. Precipitation is relatively well distributed year-round in many areas with this climate, while others may see a marked reduction in wintry precipitation and even a wintertime drought. The Köppen Climate Classification subtype for this climate is "Dfa" (Hot Summer Continental Climate).

Climate data for Merriman
Month	Jan	Feb	Mar	Apr	May	Jun	Jul	Aug	Sep	Oct	Nov	Dec	Year
Mean daily maximum °C (°F)	1 (33)	4 (39)	8 (46)	15 (59)	21 (69)	27 (80)	31 (87)	30 (86)	25 (77)	18 (64)	8 (46)	3 (37)	15 (59)
Mean daily minimum °C (°F)	−12 (10)	−9 (15)	−6 (21)	0 (32)	5 (41)	11 (51)	14 (57)	13 (55)	7 (44)	1 (33)	−5 (23)	−10 (14)	0 (32)
Average precipitation mm (inches)	13 (0.5)	13 (0.5)	23 (0.9)	48 (1.9)	76 (3)	84 (3.3)	69 (2.7)	48 (1.9)	36 (1.4)	28 (1.1)	15 (0.6)	10 (0.4)	460 (18)
Average precipitation days	2	3	3	4	9	7	7	6	4	2	2	2	51
Source: Weatherbase

== Notable people ==
- Arthur Bowring, rancher and legislator
- Eva Bowring, member of the United States Senate in 1954
- Val Logsdon Fitch, physicist and Nobel Prize laureate
