= Fort Niobrara =

Military post in Nebraska, United States (1880–1906)

- Near Valentine, Nebraska

Location
- Coordinates: 42°53′35″N 100°28′38″W

Site history
- Built: 1880
- In use: 1906

Fort Niobrara was a U.S. Army post located in north-central Nebraska, near the present-day town of Valentine. It was established in 1880 and abandoned in 1906.

== History ==
Constructed along the Niobrara River after the Great Sioux War of 1876, it was part of a military strategy to surround and contain bands of Lakota people on their reservation lands located in the Dakota Territory. Fort Niobrara was intended to oversee Chief Spotted Tail's band of about 8,000 Brulé Lakota at the Rosebud Agency, about 40 miles north of the fort in what is now South Dakota.

The arrival of the FE&MV Railroad in 1882–1883 transformed the role of the fort, making it an important distribution point for supplies being provided to the Lakota agencies. The railroad also transformed the post into one of a number of Army garrisons throughout the United States in the 1880s and 1890s interlinked by railroad.

The presence of the fort was a positive factor assisting economic development of the surrounding region of north-central Nebraska from 1880 to 1906, including the town of Valentine, Nebraska, which was built in 1882 just a few miles west of the post. In the 1880s the fort was garrisoned by units of the 9th Infantry, 5th Cavalry, and 9th Cavalry. Although the garrison had both black and white segregated military units, no serious incidents occurred, racial or otherwise. During the 1880s the soldiers escorted supply trains to the Lakota, Dakota, and Nakota agencies in the Dakotas, assisted in maintaining law and order, attempted to prevent cattle rustling from Indian herds on the reservation, and attempted to keep white ranchers from unlawfully grazing herds on Indian lands.

In November and December 1890 the garrison responded to the Ghost Dance crises on the Sioux reservations by securing the Rosebud Agency. After the related Wounded Knee Massacre, the fort was enlarged. During the 1890s the post was at its zenith. It was the headquarters for the 8th Infantry, 12th Infantry, and 6th Cavalry with a garrison of about 500 soldiers. Detachments were dispatched from the fort by railroad to provide assistance during times of civil strife, including the Johnson County War in Wyoming in 1892 and the national Pullman Strike in 1894.

Starting in the 1880s and continuing into the 1890s and up to 1906 soldiers garrisoned at the fort engaged in field exercises in and around the post, including long marches, target practice, and field training to develop and maintain skills in field tactics. This field training ranged beyond the military reservation, and also involved units from other forts who came to Fort Niobrara by rail.

When the Spanish–American War broke out in 1898, the post was immediately stripped down to a skeletal garrison of less than 100 men. To the citizens of Valentine and Cherry County, the absence of soldiers at the fort meant a drop in prosperity, and they lobbied for the fort to be re-garrisoned.

The black segregated U.S. 25th Infantry Regiment was stationed at the fort from 1902 to July 1906, when the post was finally abandoned. The 25th had good relations with the Nebraskan community around the fort during these years, but in sharp contrast, they encountered immediate and extreme racial prejudice upon relocation to Texas.

The post was used as a remount station from 1906 to 1911. All but about seven of the adobe and frame buildings at the fort were razed, leaving a level plain. In 1912 about 16,000 acres were set aside to become the Fort Niobrara National Wildlife Refuge. In 1913, about 35,000 acres of the military reservation were opened to settlement.

Famous military figures stationed at the fort include John J. Pershing, Frederick W. Benteen, and James S. Brisbin. The site of the fort just east of Valentine, Nebraska may be visited today, though with the exception of one barn, little evidence remains of its historic past.

== Establishment and purpose ==
The site of Fort Niobrara was selected by General George Crook in 1879 and the fort was occupied and constructed in 1880. The fort was sited on the south bank of the Niobrara River, for which it was named, at a location several miles east of present-day Valentine, Nebraska.

Following the Great Sioux War of 1876, the seven bands of the Lakota had been mostly confined to the Great Sioux Reservation. Though the reservation was reduced in size in 1877, it was still large and extended westward from the Missouri River into the southwest portion of the Dakota Territory. Different Lakota bands had been assigned to different agency sites throughout the large reservation. However, it was unknown whether these bands of Lakota would remain at their agency sites or if they would stay on the reservation at all.

U.S. military strategy after the Great Sioux War called for a series of Army forts to be located around the boundaries of the Sioux Reservation in order to contain the Sioux, and Fort Niobrara was one such fort. It was located in Nebraska just 7 miles south of the reservation boundary and about 40 miles south of the Rosebud Agency. The purpose of the fort was to watch over the activities of Chief Spotted Tail's band of about 8,000 Brulé Lakota, who were assigned to the Rosebud Agency. The fort was deliberately located off the reservation to avoid friction with the Sioux, and to provide protection and security for apprehensive white settlers in the north-central portion of Nebraska, which was immediately adjacent to the southern boundary of the Great Sioux Reservation.

The site of Fort Niobrara was on a broad plain on the south bank of the Niobrara River. Initial buildings of the fort were constructed between April and November 1880. Civilian carpenters and laborers assisted in this initial phase of construction. The buildings were built of adobe because of abundant clay near the site, and they had foundations of limestone blocks quarried near the post. Supplies were freighted in from Neligh, Nebraska, the nearest railroad terminus, 158 miles to the east.

== Arrival of the railroad ==
The arrival of the railroad at Fort Niobrara in 1882–1883 had a transformative impact on the fort, increasing its role and function and acting to extend its period of service beyond that of other western frontier forts.

In 1882–1883 the Fremont, Elkhorn and Missouri Valley Railroad (FE&MV) built westward to Fort Niobrara and beyond. With the railroad came reliable telegraph connections. The railroad linked Fort Niobrara with Fort Robinson, 170 miles to the west. Fort Robinson was similarly located in the state of Nebraska, just south of the Great Sioux Reservation boundary and the Pine Ridge Agency where the Oglala Lakota were located. The arrival of the railroad and telegraph connections suddenly increased the potential of the garrisons of the two forts to act in coordinated and concerted military action in the event of trouble on the Great Sioux Reservation.

The railroad also made the fort area the transportation hub for the large volume of treaty goods and supplies that the Indian Department regularly provided to about 8,000 Brulé Lakota at the Rosebud Agency located 40 miles to the north. From the railroad, the fort supplied military escorts for the freight that went north to the agencies.

The railroad greatly simplified supply logistics for Fort Niobrara, setting it apart from other more isolated western frontier forts which did not have the benefit of railroad connections. In the first two years of operation, before the arrival of the railroad, freight carried by wagon had taken 10 days to reach the fort from the nearest rail terminus at Neligh, Nebraska.

The railroad also allowed much easier movements of soldiers to and from the fort for military operations and transformed the fort into one of a chain of garrison forts interlinked by a railroad network across the United States in the 1880s and 1890s. Thus the railroad allowed Fort Niobrara to be retained in a network of garrison posts in the western United States, long after the Indian Wars had ceased and other more remote forts had closed.

The railroad extended the potential for field training by allowing units from other forts to come to Fort Niobrara, or allowing the local garrison to go out to other sites. Finally the railroad simply made access easier for the soldier, whether he was on leave or being reassigned to the fort, or simply going up or down the line for social purposes.

== Effect on the surrounding Nebraska region ==
The construction of the fort in 1880 brought a sense of security to settlers in north-central Nebraska, offsetting concerns about the large concentrations of Lakota bands on their reservation, located just across the state boundary in the Dakota Territory. The arrival of the railroad also stimulated the flow of settlers into the area and in 1882 Valentine, Nebraska came into existence, located only four miles west of the fort headquarters.

The post immediately became a major factor in the economic growth of Valentine as well as of the larger north-central Nebraska region. The fort commissary and quartermaster bought produce from the region, including hay, corn, oats, beef, milk, butter, eggs, and poultry. Soldiers stationed at the fort spent a significant portion of their annual pay (a total of about $170,000 per year in the 1880s) in Valentine. Civilian blacksmiths, wheelwrights, and teamsters were employed at the post, and the fort occasionally hired carpenters, mechanics, and plumbers, all of which stimulated the growth of the town and the surrounding region.

The citizens of north-central Nebraska apparently held the fort and its personnel in high regard. When Cherry County, a center of cattle production, was organized in 1883 from the large region in north-central Nebraska which surrounded the fort, at the behest of citizens the county was named for Lieutenant Samuel A. Cherry, who had been killed in the line of duty while pursuing horse thieves. As noted below the soldiers of the fort and the citizens of north-central Nebraska enjoyed a very positive inter-relationship in spite of the fact that the soldiers were, at times, from both white and black segregated Army units.

== History of Army units and duties ==
=== 1880 to the Ghost Dance crises of 1890 ===
From 1880 to 1885 elements of the 5th Cavalry and 9th Infantry were stationed at Fort Niobrara. In 1885 elements of the 9th Cavalry joined the garrison. In 1886 elements of the 8th Infantry arrived at the post.

The units from the 9th Cavalry were from a segregated black cavalry regiment, sometimes referred to as "Buffalo Soldiers". The headquarters of the 9th Cavalry were at Fort Robinson, 165 miles to the west. It is noteworthy that from 1885 to 1890, though the post had segregated Army units with both white and black soldiers, few problems, racial or otherwise, arose between the soldiers at Fort Niobrara.

After the formation of the fort in 1880, there were no Indian hostilities in the immediate area involving Fort Niobrara soldiers. The Ghost Dance religion in the early 1890s brought the last major Indian alarm. On November 19, Companies A, B, and H of the 8th Infantry and Troops A and G of the 9th Cavalry (a detachment of 15 officers and 217 enlisted men) marched to the Rosebud Agency, where they established a field camp and built entrenchments around the agency buildings.

Using the railroad, other army units from other parts of the United States were sent to Fort Niobrara in November and December 1890. Throughout the Ghost Dance campaign, Fort Niobrara served as an important transportation point to send troops and supplies north to the Lakota, Dakota, and Nakota reservations. Though there was tension there was no armed conflict with Brulé Lakota people at the Rosebud Agency, in contrast to the Wounded Knee Massacre on December 28, 1890, at the Pine Ridge Agency. The Wounded Knee Massacre was the last combat event in the Indian Wars in the western United States.

Aside from the short Ghost Dance interval in 1890, during the period from 1880 to 1890 soldiers at the fort had a routine existence. One routine duty was to provide a military escort for the supplies and beef provided by the government to the Rosebud Agency; during the 1880s some 8,000,000 pounds of supplies were freighted to the agency from the railhead at Valentine, and 6,000 beeves were driven from Valentine to the agency under army escort.

In the years immediately after 1880, before effective civil law enforcement was developed in Cherry County, Nebraska, the military presence at Fort Niobrara deterred lawlessness and crime on both sides of the reservation line. Lieutenant Samuel A. Cherry, a Fort Niobrara officer, was killed in the line of duty in 1881 while in pursuit of horse thieves.

The soldiers of Fort Niobrara were also assigned the very difficult duty of deterring rustling of Indian-owned cattle on the reservation. They also had the even more difficult job of preventing illegal grazing by white cattle owners on the reservation. This sometimes brought them into conflict with Nebraska area cattle ranchers.

With no demand for combat duty or specific field service, the commanders at Fort Niobrara resorted to field exercises to keep the troops fit, engaging in long marches, requiring intensive target practice, and creating "camps of instruction" which taught basic skills of cavalry and infantry tactics in the field. This field training evolved into large-scale maneuvers, sometimes shared with Army units from other posts who came to Fort Niobrara by rail.

=== 1891 to the start of the Spanish–American War in 1898 ===
Because of the Ghost Dance incident during the last months of 1890, the Army determined that the necessity of troop presence at Fort Niobrara near the Sioux reservations still existed, and after 1890 the post was expanded. The detachments at Fort Niobrara from the 5th Cavalry and 9th Cavalry were transferred to other posts. In early 1891 the fort was enlarged to become the headquarters of three regiments—the 8th Infantry, 12th Infantry, and 6th Cavalry. Starting in 1887 and continuing to the middle 1890s extensive building took place as part of the policy of post expansion.

In the mid-1890s, Fort Niobrara was at its zenith as an Army post. It was regularly garrisoned by six companies of infantry and two companies of cavalry for a total contingent of about 500 men. More importantly, the units at the fort played a part in national affairs.

Because troops could be quickly entrained and dispatched on the FE&MV Railroad, during the 1890s detachments of Fort Niobrara soldiers were sent to quell civil disturbances. Detachments were sent out in 1892 to a camp near Douglas, Wyoming to provide support during the Johnson County War. In 1894 units from the fort were sent to strategic locations along the Union Pacific railroad lines at Lima, Montana and Laramie, Wyoming to enforce a federal injunction against the nationwide strike by railroad laborers against railroad companies in the summer of 1894, called the Pullman Strike.

During the 1890s the soldiers continued to engage in field exercises in and around the post, including long marches, target practice, and field training to maintain skills of infantry field tactics. This field training ranged out from the post, and it sometimes involved units from other forts who came to Fort Niobrara by rail.

=== 1898 to the abandonment of the fort in 1906 ===
In April 1898 the United States declared war with Spain. As the Spanish–American War of 1898 got underway, Army mobilization orders swiftly dispatched soldiers to southern ports for the anticipated invasion of Cuba. The mobilization orders took soldiers out of the historic western forts built during the Indian Wars, including Fort Niobrara. The military actions of the Spanish–American War (1898) evolved into the Philippine–American War (1899–1902) as the United States became involved in suppressing a native insurrection in the Philippines.

During this four-year period from 1898 to 1902, Fort Niobrara was reduced from its former elevated status of a large regimental headquarters post to a lowly skeleton garrison of one company of the 22nd Infantry, with troop levels dropping to less than 100.

During this time the citizens of Valentine, Nebraska were anxious for the return of the soldiers, whose presence meant prosperity, and they did what they could to influence the return of troops to the post.

Finally, in 1902, the 25th Army Regiment was ordered to Fort Niobrara. The 25th Infantry Regiment was returning from combat duty in the Philippines during the Philippine–American War. Like the units of the 9th Cavalry previously stationed at Fort Niobrara, the 25th was a segregated black army unit.

Fort Niobrara became home to the 25th Regiment from 1902 to 1906. The headquarters of the 25th Regiment was located at Fort Niobrara, as well as the 1st and 3rd regimental battalions. The post complement rose to over 800 soldiers and officers.

Though the numbers of soldiers at the post from 1902 to 1906 (about 800) were higher than the garrison in the 1890s (about 500), the 25th was not utilized for any military purposes during this period, and by hindsight appeared to be "warehoused" at Fort Niobrara, while larger and more centralized posts were planned and built. From 1902 to 1906, the 25th remained without orders for any active duty. At Fort Niobrara, they were subject to ongoing field exercises and maneuvers including practice marches, target practice, and training in infantry tactics. The 25th remained at the fort for the four years, with the exception of large-scale maneuvers at Fort Riley in 1904 and a rifle competition at Fort Riley in 1905. The soldiers had little to interrupt the routine of garrison life. Nevertheless, the soldiers had their own off-duty entertainments and activities. The post baseball teams were outstanding. They played other troops up and down the railroad line. In 1904, the 25th won the Army Department of the Missouri baseball championship.

During the years before 1906, it was becoming more and more apparent that the Army intended to abandon and close Fort Niobrara. Post buildings were deteriorating. Requests for building repair in years prior to 1906 were refused based on planned abandonment.

In May 1906 the orders finally arrived formally directing the abandonment of Fort Niobrara. On July 28, 1906, the troops of the 25th Infantry Regiment left the fort and marched to the rail station in Valentine to board trains. During the four-year period that the 25th was at Fort Niobrara, relations between soldiers and civilians were good, with little racial strife or controversy. On the day the 25th departed several hundred Valentine citizens gathered and remained with the troops until 12:20 AM when their trains departed.

The experience of the 25th Infantry at Fort Niobrara in north-central Nebraska is in sharp contrast to their experience at Fort Brown, near Brownsville, Texas, where they were reassigned in July 1906. At Brownsville, the soldiers of the 25th were immediately subject to intense racial discrimination, and when a fight occurred in the city, it acted to bar members of the 25th from the city limits. On August 13, 1906 (just over two weeks after leaving Fort Niobrara), a shooting incident occurred in Brownsville in which a bartender was killed and a Hispanic police officer was wounded. The Brownsville townspeople immediately blamed the shootings on the black soldiers of the 25th Infantry at Fort Brown, though their white officers confirmed the soldiers were all in their barracks at the time of the shootings. When an intensive investigation developed no usable evidence against the soldiers of the 25th, President Roosevelt ordered 167 of the black soldiers dishonorably discharged because of their "conspiracy of silence". A renewed investigation in 1970 exonerated the discharged troopers. This entire episode in Texas is known as the Brownsville affair.

=== Noted officers stationed at Fort Niobrara ===
Among the officers once stationed at Fort Niobrara were John J. Pershing,(stationed at the Fort from February, 1891 to September 1891) later commander of U.S. forces in World War I, and Frederick W. Benteen, (stationed at the Fort in June 1886 for a very limited time, just prior to retirement) a survivor of General Custer's ill-fated staff, and Lt. Col. James S. Brisbin, (served for two years at the Fort) famous for his book, "The Beef Bonanza", promoting livestock raising in the west.

== Events after 1906 at the site of Fort Niobrara ==
After the soldiers left the post, it was transferred to the Quartermaster Department. A handful of seven buildings were retained for the headquarters for quartermaster remount operations, and the rest were sold at auction in 1906, with the condition they be demolished and the grounds of the fort left clean.

From 1906 to 1911 a small cadre of quartermaster offices and employees operated the fort as a remount depot, where they supervised the purchase of horses for cavalry and artillery.

In 1912, after the remount depot activities ended, sixteen thousand acres of the original military reservation was set aside as a national game preserve by a conservation minded federal administration. The remainder of 55 sections (about 35,000 acres) of the Fort was opened for settlement in 1913.

The nucleus of 16,000 acres has been enlarged and has since become Fort Niobrara National Wildlife Refuge, with ranges maintaining a sizable herd of buffalo. The portion of the Niobrara River that flowed by the Fort and on through the military reservation is now part of Niobrara National Scenic River.

== Preservation ==
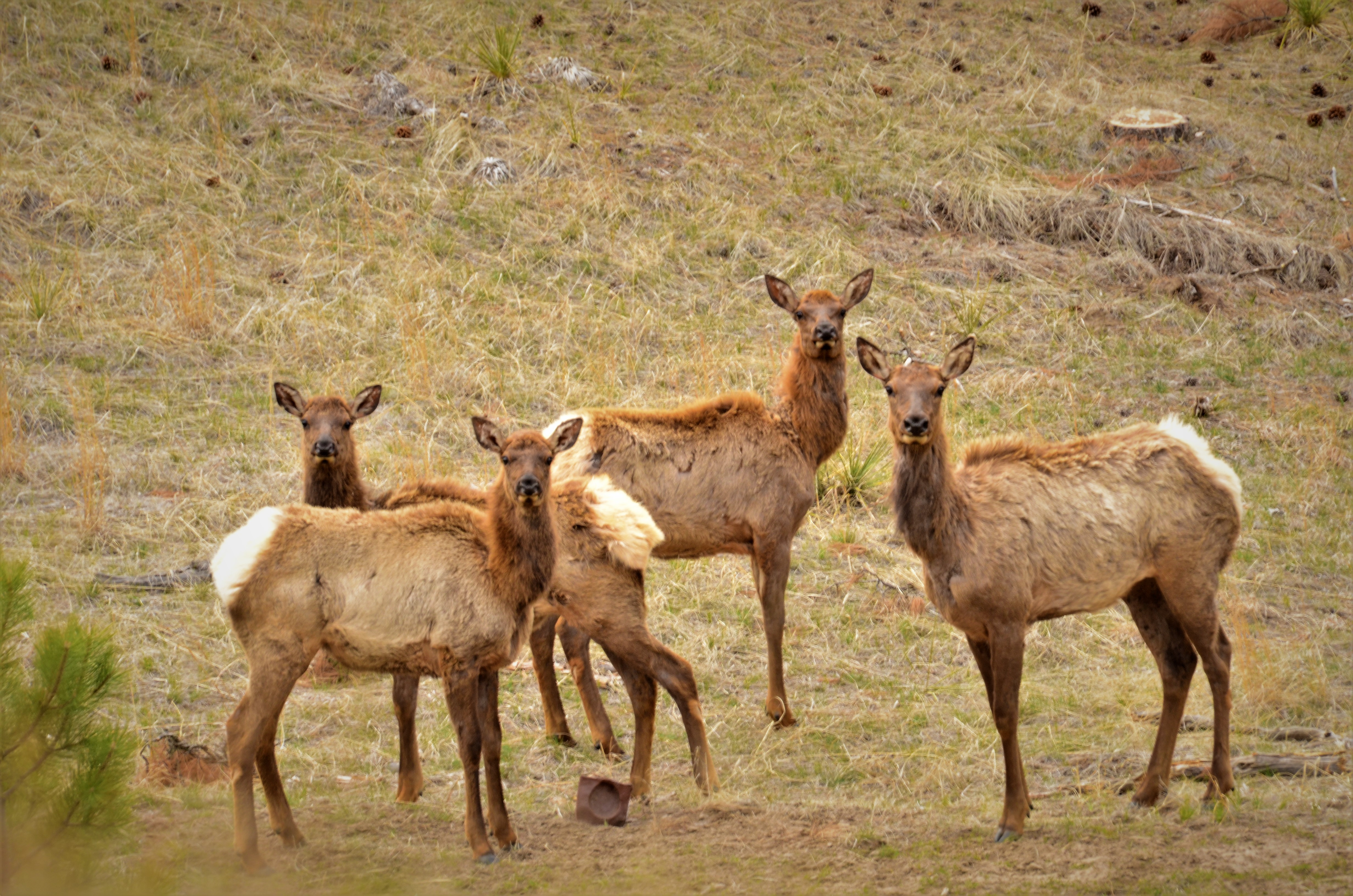
Herd of cow and calf elk at Fort Niobrara National Wildlife Refuge, 2011

A Nebraska state highway marker commemorating the fort is located on U.S. 20, about 1.5 miles southeast of Valentine, Nebraska. The site of the fort headquarters was located at the present-day headquarters for the Fort Niobrara National Wildlife Refuge where additional commemorative signs exist. The Wildlife Refuge maintains a visitor center. At the Wildlife Refuge, all that remains of the fort is one building (the red barn), old foundations, and earthworks. To reach the Fort Niobrara National Wildlife Refuge headquarters, take Nebraska Highway 12 (also called the Outlaw Trail Scenic Byway) east and northeast from Valentine, Nebraska for about 4.5 miles, and then follow signs for the Wildlife Refuge, turning back east over a bridge over the Niobrara River for about three-quarters of a mile.

== Photos ==
Historical photos of Fort Niobrara collected by the Nebraska Library Commission may be found at this footnoted site. Other historic photos are at these footnoted sites.
