= Arthur Bowring =

American politician

Arthur Bowring (April 20, 1873 – March 19, 1944) was an American rancher and politician.

Born in Dow City, Iowa, Bowring moved with his family to Nebraska. In 1894, Bowring filed a claim for land in Cherry County, Nebraska that became his ranch. In 1928, he married Eva Kelly who would be appointed to the United States Senate. Their ranch Bowring Ranch State Historical Park is a Nebraska historical site. Bowring was active in politics. He served as county commissioner. He served as a Republican in the Nebraska House of Representatives 1927-1929 and then the Nebraska State Senate 1930–1933. Bowring died in a hospital in Chadron, Nebraska after suffering a heart attack.
