= Cody, Nebraska =

- Village
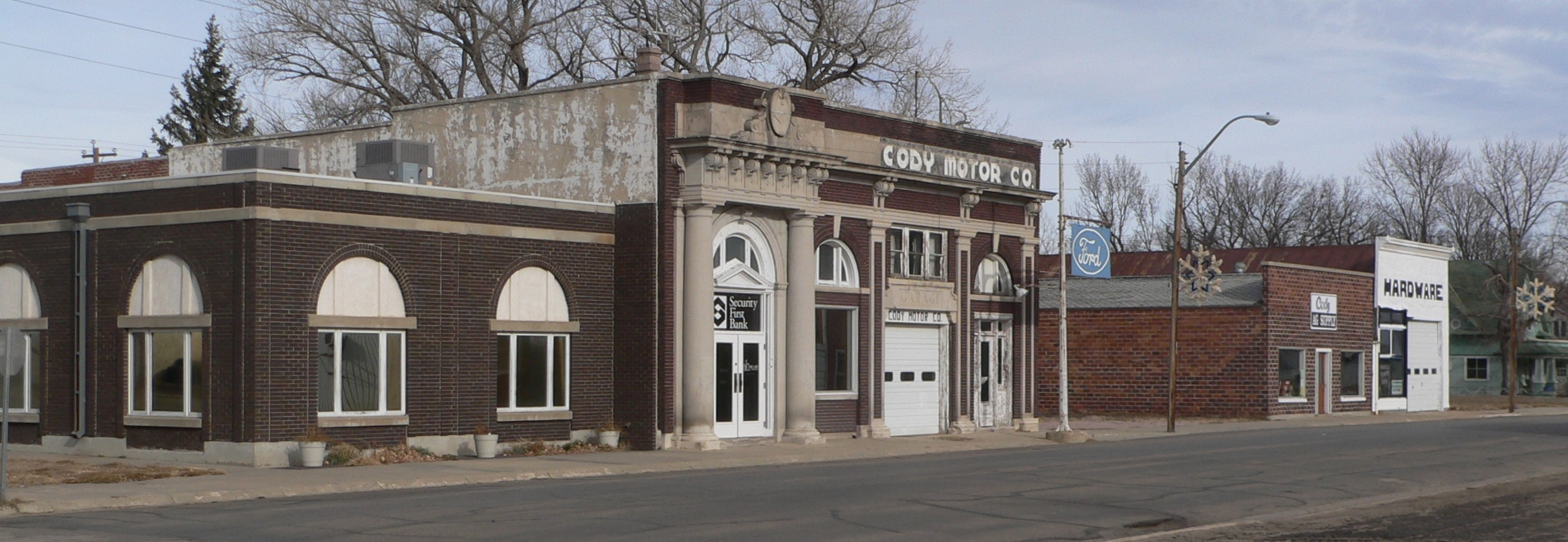
- Downtown Cody

- Location of Cody, Nebraska
- Coordinates: 42°56′16″N 101°14′56″W
- Country: United States
- State: Nebraska
- County: Cherry

Area
  - Total: 1.03 sq mi (2.67 km^{2})
  - Land: 1.03 sq mi (2.67 km^{2})
  - Water: 0 sq mi (0.00 km^{2})
- Elevation: 3,097 ft (944 m)

Population (2020)
  - Total: 168
  - Density: 162.9/sq mi (62.91/km^{2})
- Time zone: UTC-7 (Mountain (MST))
  - Summer (DST): UTC-6 (MDT)
- ZIP code: 69211
- Area code: 402
- FIPS code: 31-09760
- GNIS feature ID: 2398594

Cody is a village in Cherry County, Nebraska, United States. As of the 2020 census, the village had a total population of 168.

== History ==
Cody was platted in 1886 when the railroad was extended to that point. It was named for Thomas Cody, a railroad foreman.

== Geography ==
According to the United States Census Bureau, the village has a total area of 1.03 square miles (2.67 km^{2}), all land.

== Business ==
The students from Cody-Kilgore Public School have helped to run the Circle C grocery store and were featured on Harvest Public Media and The News Hour nationally on PBS.

The town also has a city park with camping facilities and showers for travelers, including cyclists riding the Cowboy Trail through town.

== Demographics ==
Historical population
Census	Pop.	Note	%±
1910	185		—
1920	428		131.4%
1930	408		−4.7%
1940	375		−8.1%
1950	296		−21.1%
1960	230		−22.3%
1970	246		7.0%
1980	177		−28.0%
1990	177		0.0%
2000	149		−15.8%
2010	154		3.4%
2020	168		9.1%
U.S. Decennial Census; 2012 Estimate

=== 2010 census ===
As of the census of 2010, there were 154 people, 66 households, and 43 families residing in the village. The population density was 149.5 inhabitants per square mile (57.7/km^{2}). There were 88 housing units at an average density of 85.4 per square mile (33.0/km^{2}). The racial makeup of the village was 92.9% White, 4.5% Native American, and 2.6% from two or more races.

There were 66 households, of which 27.3% had children under the age of 18 living with them, 57.6% were married couples living together, 6.1% had a female householder with no husband present, 1.5% had a male householder with no wife present, and 34.8% were non-families. 34.8% of all households were made up of individuals, and 19.7% had someone living alone who was 65 years of age or older. The average household size was 2.33 and the average family size was 3.00.

The median age in the village was 45 years. 27.9% of residents were under the age of 18; 5.2% were between the ages of 18 and 24; 16.8% were from 25 to 44; 29.9% were from 45 to 64; and 20.1% were 65 years of age or older. The gender makeup of the village was 50.6% male and 49.4% female.

=== 2000 census ===
As of the census of 2000, there were 149 people, 66 households, and 45 families residing in the village. The population density was 145.2 inhabitants per square mile (56.1/km^{2}). There were 81 housing units at an average density of 79.0 per square mile (30.5/km^{2}). The racial makeup of the village was 94.63% White, 0.67% Native American, 2.68% Asian, and 2.01% from two or more races.

There were 66 households, out of which 30.3% had children under the age of 18 living with them, 48.5% were married couples living together, 18.2% had a female householder with no husband present, and 31.8% were non-families. 27.3% of all households were made up of individuals, and 9.1% had someone living alone who was 65 years of age or older. The average household size was 2.26 and the average family size was 2.71.

In the village, the population was spread out, with 28.2% under the age of 18, 2.7% from 18 to 24, 26.2% from 25 to 44, 22.1% from 45 to 64, and 20.8% who were 65 years of age or older. The median age was 42 years. For every 100 females, there were 77.4 males. For every 100 females age 18 and over, there were 75.4 males.

The median income for a household in the village was $25,357, and the median income for a family was $31,250. Males had a median income of $23,333 versus $13,750 for females. The per capita income for the village was $17,772. There were 18.2% of families and 25.3% of the population living below the poverty line, including 30.0% of under eighteens and 20.0% of those over 64.
