= Samuel A. Cherry =

Samuel Austin Cherry (April 14, 1850 – May 11, 1881) was a lieutenant in the United States Army. He spent most of his military career at posts in Wyoming and Nebraska. In 1879, he participated in the Battle of Milk Creek, where he commanded a group of 20 men in a rear-guard action that allowed their column to make an orderly withdrawal from a superior Ute force and establish a defensive position. Cherry was able to bring all 20 of his men back to the column.

In 1881, while based at Fort Niobrara, Nebraska, Cherry was killed by a drunken soldier. In 1883, his name was given to the newly organized Cherry County, Nebraska, which included Ft. Niobrara.

== Early life ==
Cherry was born April 14, 1850, in Lagrange, Indiana, and spent his boyhood there. In 1870, he was admitted to the United States Military Academy in West Point, New York. There, he pushed a classmate away from a falling cannon, which collided with Cherry. The injury left him with a limp for the rest of his life. He graduated from the Academy in June 1875, ranked 35th in a class of 43.

Upon his graduation, Cherry was promoted to the rank of second lieutenant in the 23rd Infantry. In September of that year, he was assigned to frontier duty at Fort D. A. Russell in Wyoming. In 1876, he was transferred to the 5th Cavalry, in which he continued to serve at various posts in Wyoming.

== Battle of Milk Creek ==
On September 21, 1879, Cherry was attached to a column of about 175 soldiers consisting of one infantry and three cavalry companies under the command of Major Thomas T. Thornbergh. Thornbergh had been ordered to march from Ft. Steele (near present-day Rawlins, Wyoming) to the White River Indian Reservation in Colorado in response to a request for help from Nathan C. Meeker, the White River Indian Agent, who had become engaged in altercations with the Ute Tribe.

On September 29 at noon, Cherry was leading a small detachment making an advance scout in front of the main body, which had crossed the Milk River which was the Ute reservation boundary, when he detected a body of some 300 to 400 Ute warriors waiting in ambush. Cherry waved his hat and a single shot was fired followed by general firing from the Indians. Realizing they were outnumbered, the Army units sought to draw back. Major Thornburgh was killed and command passed to Captain J. Scott Payne, who was also wounded. Cherry and a group of 20 men were ordered to undertake a rear guard action to allow the rest of the command to withdraw and then consolidate a defensive position. With courage and skill, Cherry conducted a combined retreat and rear guard action over more than 1000 yards, that held the large force of Indians in check, and brought all of his 20 men back to the column. While no fatalities took place, many were wounded while under intense hostile fire. The column, outnumbered and entrenched in defensive positions, underwent a siege by the larger Ute force that went on for six days. Couriers were dispatched for help resulting in the arrival of Company D, 9th Cavalry on October 2, and on October 5 the siege was lifted by the arrival of Colonel Wesley Merit with about 450 men of the 5th Cavalry.

This engagement became known as the Battle of Milk Creek, part of the White River War. On the day the battle started, Ute Indians attacked the agency and killed agent Meeker in what is now known as the Meeker Massacre.

After the battle, the fourteen non-commissioned officers from the three cavalry companies engaged in the battle (Company E, 3rd Cavalry, and Companies D and F, 5th Cavalry) composed and signed a letter for Cherry, commending his brave and professional actions and "cool, disciplined leadership" in conducting the rear guard action that brought his entire unit back across open ground and under intense fire, to the safety of the entrenchments, with seventeen men out of twenty wounded, and further commending him for his leadership during the siege. In an article in the New York Times, Nov. 9, 1879, Cherry was commended by Capt. J. Scott Payne, 5th Cavalry, for his quick thinking, training and judgment at the Battle of Milk Creek which kept the command from being first ambushed and later overrun.

== Fort Niobrara ==
In December 1879, Cherry went on leave of absence until May 1880. For about a month after that, he served on a board in Washington, D.C. In June 1880, he was assigned to frontier duty at Fort Niobrara, near present-day Valentine, Nebraska. The newly established post was about 7 miles (11 km) south of the Sioux reservation, and about 40 miles (64 km) from the Rosebud Agency; with Fort Robinson to the west, it provided a large military presence near the Brulé and Oglala Sioux.

On May 10, 1881, Cherry was charged with leading a patrol in pursuit of several persons suspected of robbery and the theft of government horses. On May 11, in the vicinity of White Lake in South Dakota, about 8 miles (13 km) north of the post, he was fatally shot by one of his own soldiers, who was "insane from excessive drink".

Cherry was buried at Fort Niobrara. In March 1882, his father and his fiancée, Virginia White, transported his body to Greenwood Cemetery in Lagrange, Indiana.

Cherry County, Nebraska, which included Fort Niobrara, was formed by an act of the Nebraska legislature on February 23, 1883. At the behest of the citizens of the newly formed county, it was named for Cherry.

== See also ==
- Cherry County, Nebraska
- Battle of Milk Creek
