= Loup River =

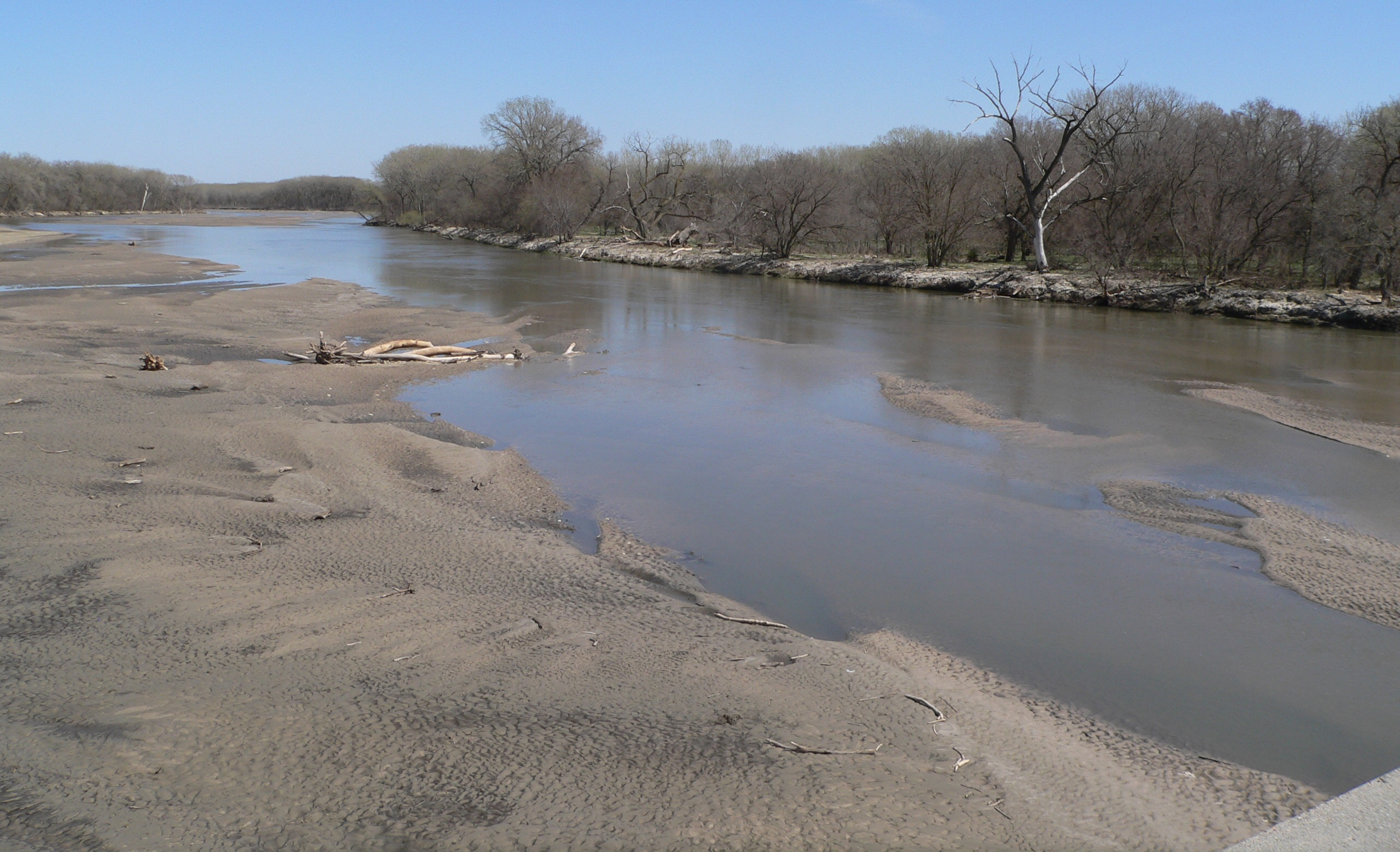
- Loup River at Nebraska Highway 39 crossing south of Genoa; looking downstream (east).

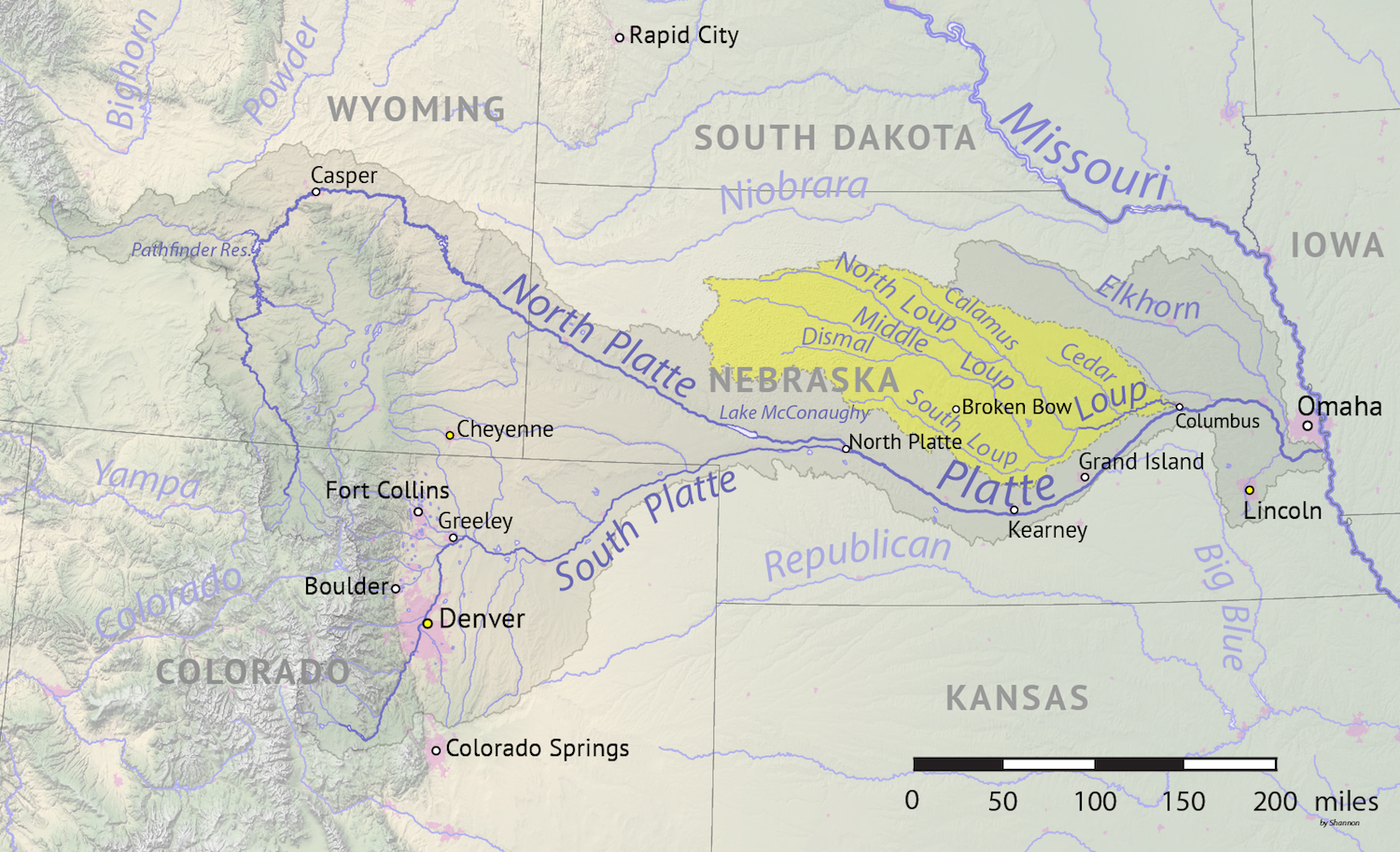
- The Loup River in Nebraska, showing the North and South Loup rivers

- Location of the mouth of the Loup River in Nebraska
- Etymology: French for "wolf", for the Skidi "Wolf People" band of the Pawnee people

Location
- Country: United States
- State: Nebraska

Physical characteristics
- Source
  - location: Howard County, Nebraska
  - coordinates: 41°16′14″N 98°24′4″W
- Mouth: Platte River
  - location: Platte County, Nebraska
  - coordinates: 41°23′58″N 97°19′17″W
  - elevation: 1,424 ft (434 m)
- Length: 68 mi (109 km)
- Basin size: 15,000 sq mi (39,000 km^{2})

The Loup River (pronounced /lup/) is a spring-fed tributary of the Platte River, approximately 68 miles (109 km) long, in central Nebraska in the United States. The river drains a sparsely populated rural agricultural area on the eastern edge of the Great Plains southeast of the Sandhills. The name of the river means "wolf" in French, named by early French trappers after the Skidi band of the Pawnee, whose name means "Wolf People," and who lived along its banks. The river and its tributaries, including the North Loup, Middle Loup, and South Loup, are known colloquially as "the Loups", comprising over 1800 mi (2900 km) of streams and draining approximately one-fifth of Nebraska.

== Course ==
The river is formed in eastern Howard County from a spring, approximately 5 miles (8 km) northeast of St. Paul and 20 miles (32 km) north of Grand Island, by the confluence of the North Loup and Middle Loup rivers. It flows east-northeast, past Fullerton, where it is joined from the north by the Cedar River. It continues east-northeast roughly parallel to the Platte, past Genoa, separated from the Platte by approximately 15 mi (24 km). It joins the Platte from the northwest approximately 4 miles (6 km) southeast of Columbus.

A diversion dam southwest of Genoa diverts water to the Loup Canal to hydroelectric facilities in Monroe and then in Columbus. The canal then runs into the Platte a short distance below its confluence with the Loup.

== Discharges ==
| River | Location | Discharge | Notes |
|---|---|---|---|
| South Loup River | St. Michael | 230 cu ft/s (6.5 m^{3}/s) | |
| Middle Loup River | St. Paul | 1,148 cu ft/s (32.5 m^{3}/s) | |
| North Loup River | near St. Paul | 975 cu ft/s (27.6 m^{3}/s) | |
| Loup River | Columbus | 2,584 cu ft/s (73.2 m^{3}/s) | Discharge includes water removed by Loup River Power Canal |

== See also ==
- Twin Bridge (Brownlee, Nebraska)
- List of Nebraska rivers
- French colonization of the Americas
- Mormon Trail
