= F.M. Walcott House =

Historic house in Nebraska, United States

- F. M. Walcott House
- U.S. National Register of Historic Places
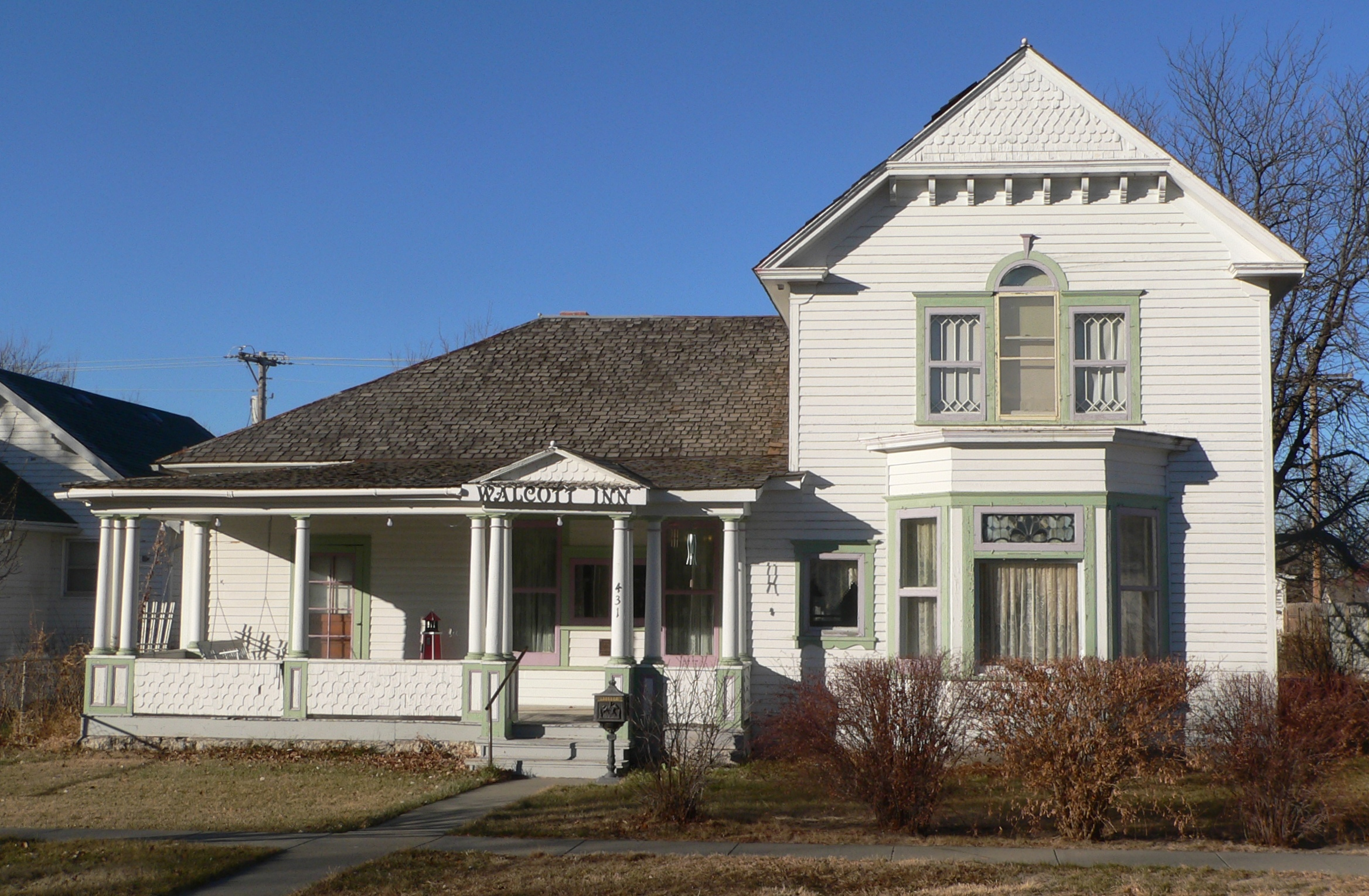

- Location within Nebraska Location within the United States
- Location: 431 N. Hall St., Valentine, Nebraska
- Coordinates: 42°52′34″N 100°33′16″W
- Area: less than one acre
- Built: 1892
- Architectural style: Classical Revival, Neo-Classical
- NRHP reference No.: 82000599
- Added to NRHP: October 7, 1982

The F.M. Walcott House, located at 431 N. Hall St. in Valentine, Nebraska, United States, is a historic Classical Revival style house that is listed on the National Register of Historic Places.

It was listed on the National Register in 1982. According to its NRHP nomination, the house was deemed locally significant architecturally "as an example of a vernacular Neo-Classical Revival dwelling, based upon earlier upright-with-wing or templeform houses common to the Greek Revival style in the eastern and midwestern states" and for association with F. M. Walcott, a county attorney and county judge who had one of the largest legal practices in Nebraska.

The vacant property was bought by Walcott in 1892 for $137.50 and the house was built that year.

It is now the Walcott Inn.
