= Fort Niobrara National Wildlife Refuge =

National Wildlife Refuge in Nebraska

- IUCN category IV (habitat/species management area)
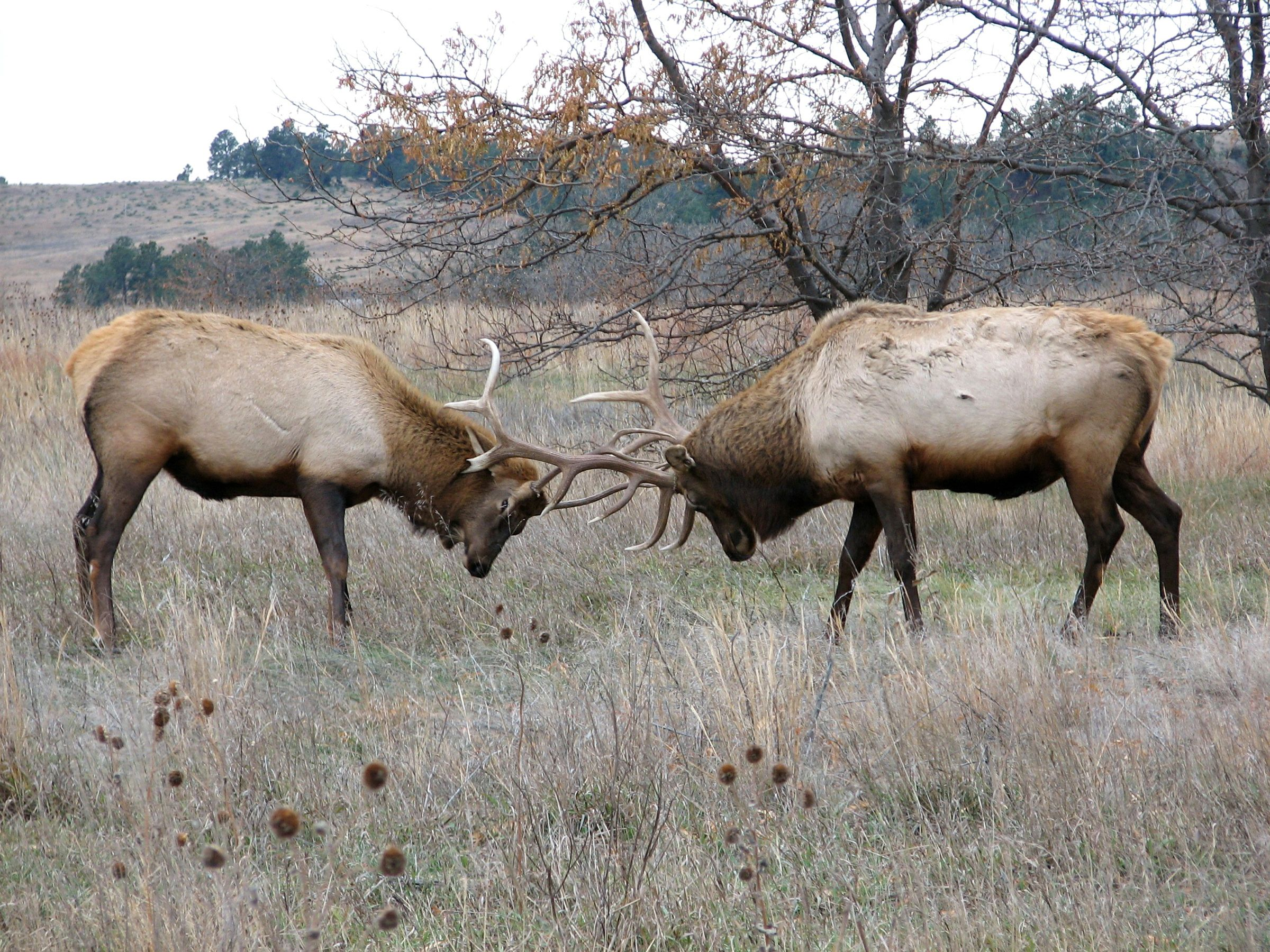
- Bull elk sparring

- Location within Nebraska Location within the United States
- Location: Cherry County, Nebraska, USA
- Nearest city: Valentine, NE
- Coordinates: 42°52′41″N 100°26′54″W
- Area: 19,131 acres (7,742 ha)
- Established: January 11, 1912
- Governing body: U.S. Fish and Wildlife Service
- Website: Fort Niobrara National Wildlife Refuge

Fort Niobrara National Wildlife Refuge is located in the U.S. state of Nebraska and includes 19,131 acres (77.42 km^{2}). The refuge borders the Niobrara National Scenic River on the west and is managed by the U.S. Fish and Wildlife Service. From 1879 to 1906, the Fort Niobrara Military Reservation was located on what later became refuge lands to house a garrison of the U.S. Cavalry. After the fort was closed, the effort to preserve the region as a wildlife refuge culminated in the creation of the refuge on January 11, 1912. The refuge also manages Valentine and John and Louise Seier National Wildlife Refuges as parts of the Fort Niobrara National Wildlife Refuge Complex.

The reservation was created by Executive order in 1912:

January 11, 1912. Niobrara Reservation. Embracing parts of townships thirty-three and thirty-four north, ranges twenty-six and twenty-seven west, Sixth Principal Meridian, Nebraska, the same being a part of the abandoned Fort Niobrara Military Reservation. This reservation was enlarged by executive order of November 14, 1912, adding approximately nine hundred acres, which included the building and old parade-grounds of the military reservation.

Fort Niobrara NWR is located along the banks of the Niobrara River in Cherry County. The river has eroded into the limestone, creating cliffs and a varied topography. This unusual alteration to the otherwise relatively featureless Great Plains presents a unique habitat that fosters numerous plant and animal species. The American Bison Society brought a bison herd to the reservation in 1913 in an effort to repopulate the region with original animal species. Over 230 species of birds have been documented, along with a 350 bison.

== Wilderness Area ==
In 1976 4,635 acres (1,876 ha) of the refuge was designated as the Fort Niobrara Wilderness. It lies along the northern banks of the Niobrara River (which is designated as the Niobrara National Scenic River through the refuge and beyond), providing sanctuary to bison, prairie dogs, mule deer, river otter and the bald eagle. A mixture of flat prairie and wooded ravines, there are no maintained trails in the wilderness. Access is only allowed during daylight hours and there is no camping or fires allowed.

U.S. Wilderness Areas do not allow motorized or mechanized vehicles, including bicycles. Although camping and fishing are allowed with a proper permit, no roads or buildings are constructed and there is also no logging or mining, in compliance with the 1964 Wilderness Act. Wilderness areas within National Forests and Bureau of Land Management areas also allow hunting (in season).

== See also ==
- List of U.S. Wilderness Areas
- Wilderness Act
- Fort Niobrara
