= Niobrara National Scenic River =

River in Nebraska, United States

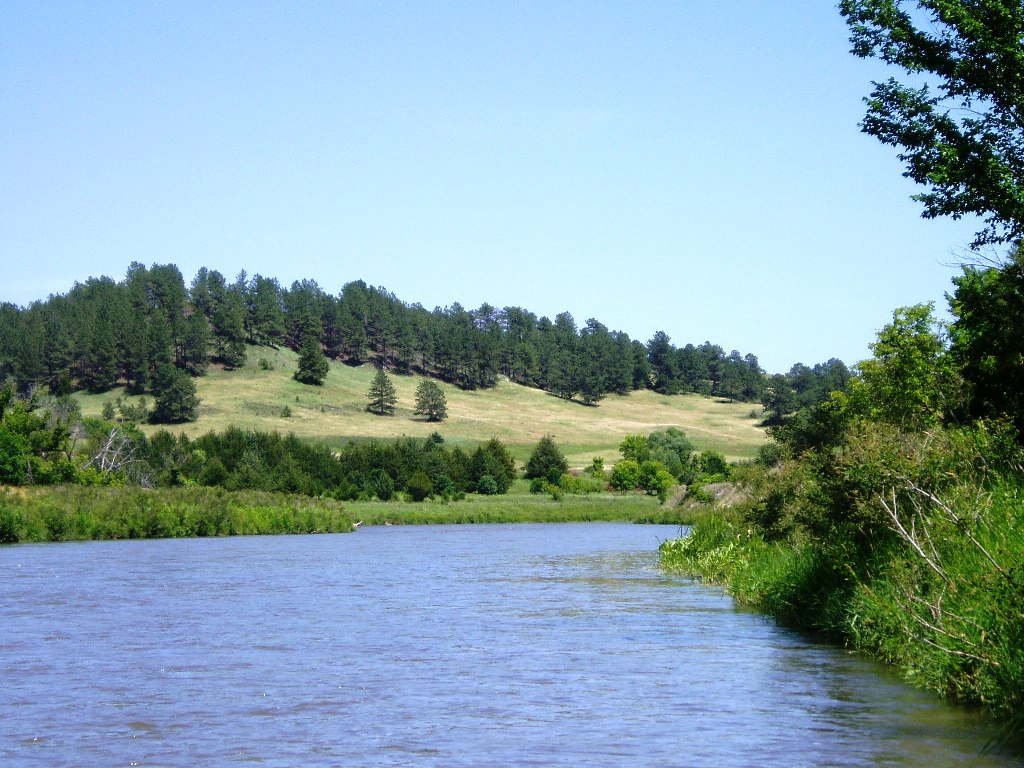
- Niobrara National Scenic River in 2003

- Location within Nebraska Location within the United States
- Location: Cherry, Keya Paha, Brown, and Rock counties, Nebraska, United States
- Nearest city: Valentine, Nebraska
- Coordinates: 42°53′N 100°19′W
- Area: 23,074 acres (93.38 km^{2})
- Established: May 24, 1991
- Visitors: 77,476 (in 2025)
- Governing body: National Park Service
- Website: Niobrara National Scenic River

National Wild and Scenic River
- Type: Scenic, Recreational
- Designated: May 24, 1991

The Niobrara National Scenic River is a section of the Niobrara River in north-central Nebraska, United States, approximately 300 miles (480 km) northwest of Omaha. In 1991, Congress set aside 76 miles (120 km) for preservation under the management of the National Park Service with assistance from the local Niobrara Council. Several "outstandingly remarkable values" have been designated to be protected along the Niobrara National Scenic River, including: Fish and Wildlife, Scenery, Fossil Resources, Geology, and Recreation. The river was designated by Backpacker magazine as one of the 10 best rivers for canoeing in the United States.

Along the National Scenic River are numerous waterfalls that empty into the river from the surrounding cliff and canyon walls; the highest one is Smith Falls, which drops almost 63 feet (19 m) into the river valley. There are short sections of Class I and II rapids on the river, and several locations further downstream require a portage around the rapids. The westernmost 26 miles (40 km) of the Scenic River section, from the Fort Niobrara National Wildlife Refuge (just east of Valentine) to the Rocky Ford portage, offer canoeing, kayaking, and tubing opportunities. Although the remainder of the river can be paddled, access is limited by private landholder permission. Around 75,000 people visit the river annually, with the months of June through August being the busiest. Water levels decline slightly in late summer, but the river can still be enjoyed by canoe, kayak, and inner tube.

Considered an extraordinary example of a Great Plains river, the Niobrara is home to over 500 plant species, many of which are at their range edge or outside of their core distribution, including many not otherwise naturally found within several hundred miles. These species include paper birch, ponderosa pine and a rare hybrid aspen (quaking X bigtooth). Species from six different vegetation communities can be found in proximity along the river. Northern boreal forest species occur on north facing slopes where shade and abundant ground water create cooler microclimates. Species growing here include paper birch, aspen, ferns, and club mosses. Rocky Mountain forest plants include ponderosa pine, serviceberry, and horizontal juniper. Eastern deciduous forests grow on the moist bottom lands and islands of the Niobrara. They include American elm, American basswood, eastern cottonwood, green ash, bur oak, common hackberry, and box elder. Three types of prairie are found in the river valley, displaying a botanical transition between among the eastern tallgrass prairie, the Sandhills mixed-grass prairie, and Northern mixed-grass prairie. Mule deer, beaver, mink, pronghorn, river otter and even bison can be found in the area. Approximately 300 bison and a few dozen elk are protected in the 19,000 acre (77 km^{2}) Fort Niobrara National Wildlife Refuge, which is located along the river.

In the Niobrara River, minnows such as sand shiner, red shiner and flathead chub search for their food of aquatic insects near streambank margins. Larger fish, such as rainbow and brown trout, prefer cooler, clear water where springbranch canyon tributaries enter the river. Channel catfish, a popular game fish, prefer deeper waters or cover during the day and feed at night in the riffles. Softshell, snapping, and painted turtles may be found sunning on logs in summer.

The scenic river is spanned by 15 bridges, including six which are listed on the National Register of Historic Places.
