= Cherry County Courthouse =

- U.S. National Register of Historic Places
- U.S. Historic district
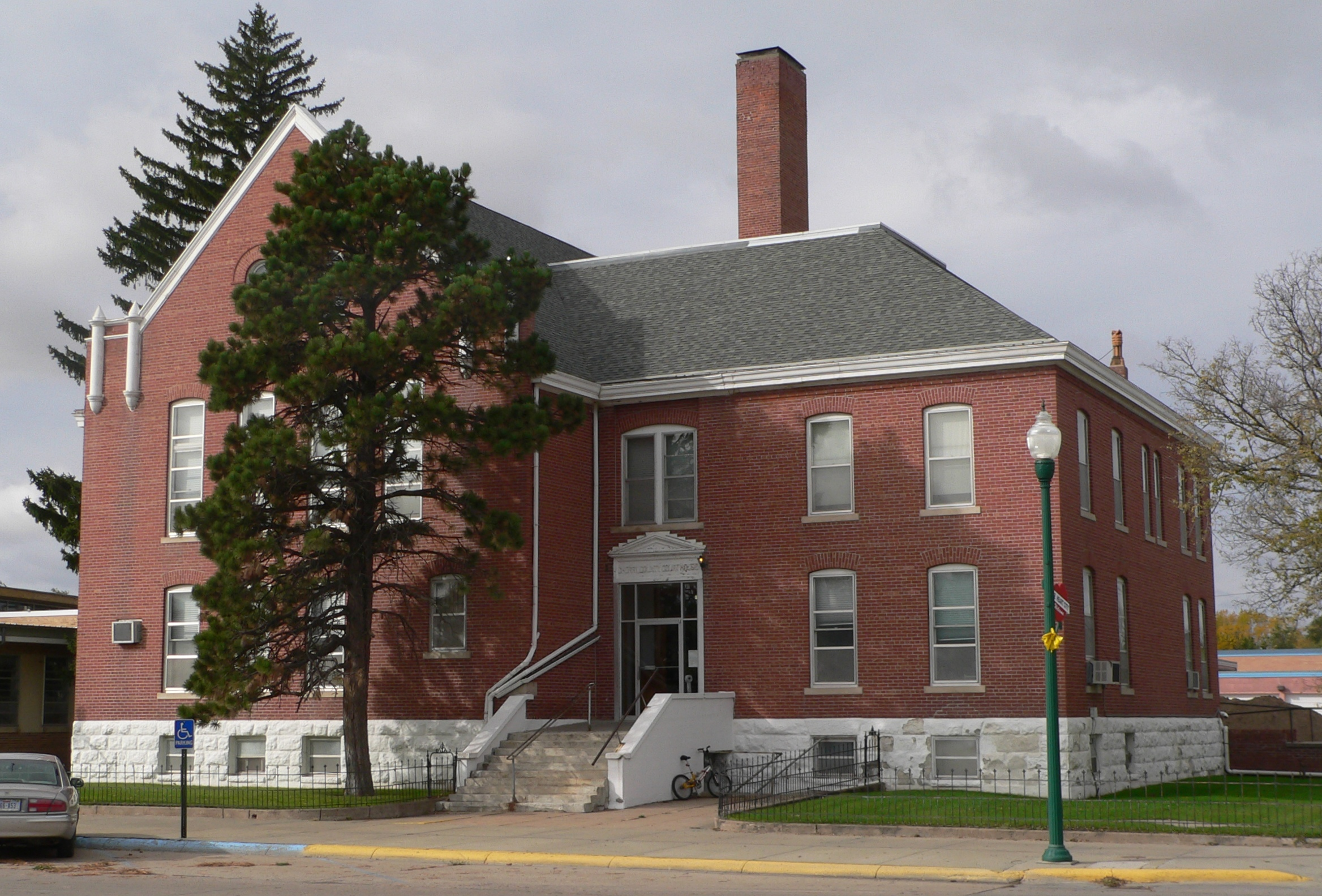

- Location within Nebraska Location within the United States
- Location: 4th and Main Sts., Valentine, Nebraska
- Coordinates: 42°52′34″N 100°33′2″W
- Area: less than one acre
- Built: 1901
- Built by: Misner, M.T.
- Architectural style: Romanesque
- MPS: County Courthouses of Nebraska MPS
- NRHP reference No.: 89002229
- Added to NRHP: January 10, 1990

The Cherry County Courthouse, at 4th and Main Sts. in Valentine, Nebraska, is a Romanesque-style historic building that was built in 1901. It is listed on the National Register of Historic Places. In its NRHP nomination, the courthouse was deemed "historically significant for its association with politics and local government", and serving as a good example of a county government building in Nebraska.

It was listed on the National Register of Historic Places in 1990. The listing included two contributing objects in addition to the courthouse building, a contributing building.
