= Brownlee, Nebraska =

- Unincorporated Community and Census-Designated Place
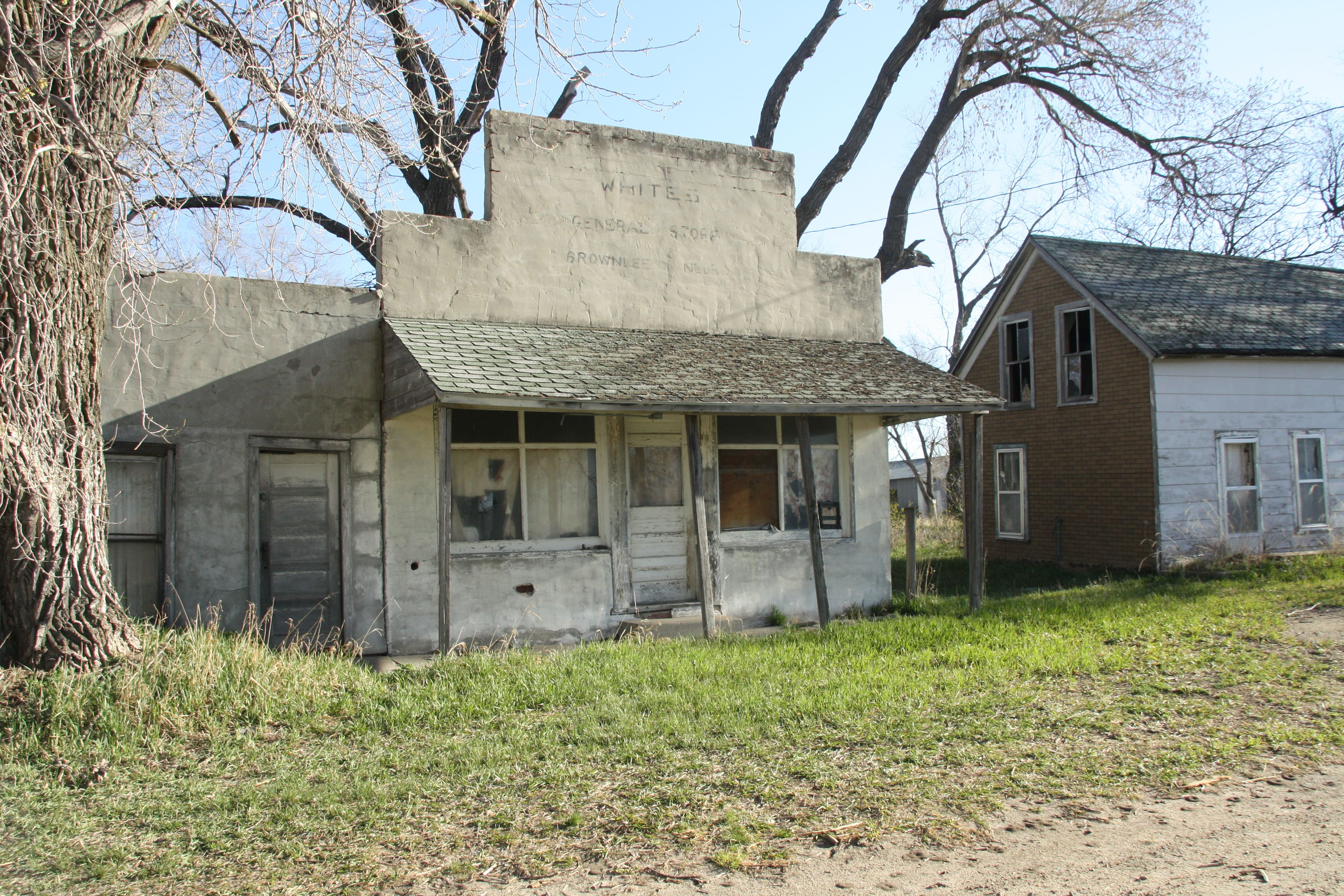

- Location within Nebraska Location within the United States
- Coordinates: 42.3°N 100.6°W
- Country: United States
- State: Nebraska
- County: Cherry

Area
  - Total: 0.11 sq mi (0.28 km^{2})
  - Land: 0.11 sq mi (0.28 km^{2})
  - Water: 0 sq mi (0.00 km^{2})
- Elevation: 2,871 ft (875 m)

Population (2020)
  - Total: 13
  - Density: 122.2/sq mi (47.19/km^{2})
- ZIP code: 69166
- Area code: 308
- FIPS code: 31-06680
- GNIS feature ID: 2583877

Brownlee is an unincorporated community and census-designated place in Cherry County, Nebraska, United States. As of the 2020 census it had a population of 13. It is located on the North Loup River, 5 miles (8 km) west of U.S. Route 83 in the Sandhills region of the state.

== History ==
Founded in 1886 by John R. Lee and William B. Lee, immigrants from Ireland. Brownlee was given the maiden name of the founder's grandmother.

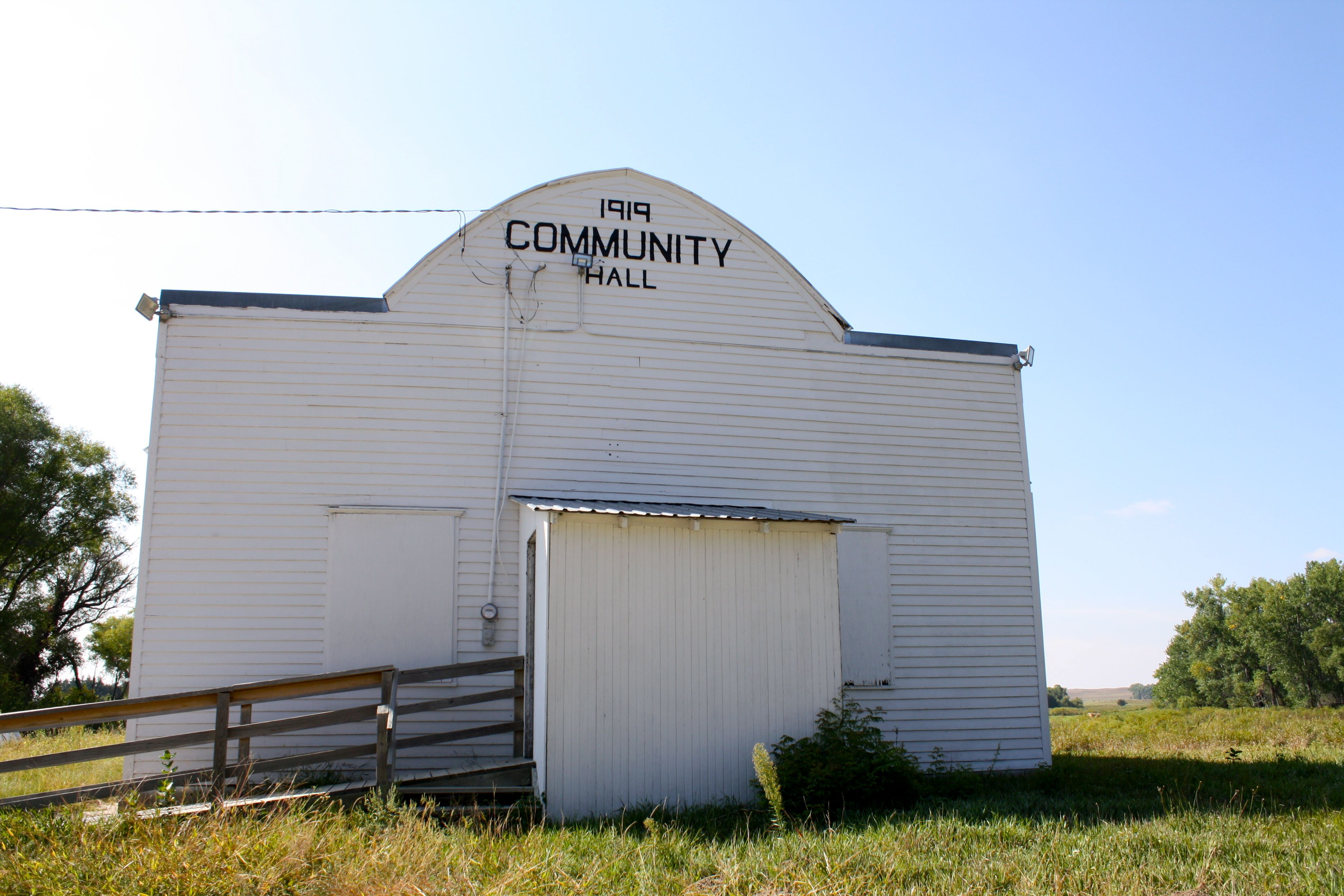
Community Hall

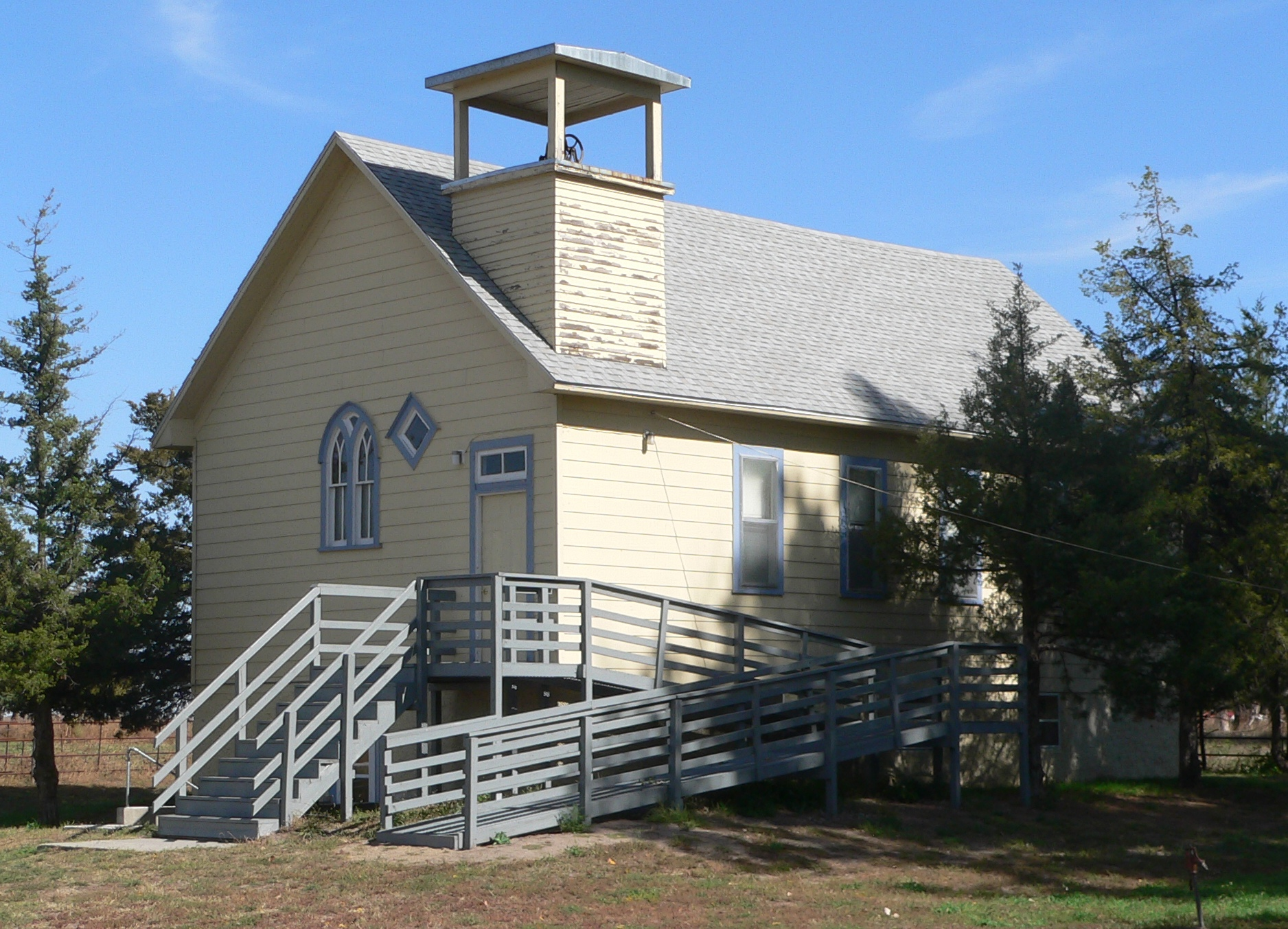
Brownlee church

== Demographics ==
Historical population
Census	Pop.	Note	%±
2010	15		—
2020	13		−13.3%
U.S. Decennial Census
