= Cherry County, Nebraska =

County in Nebraska, United States

- County
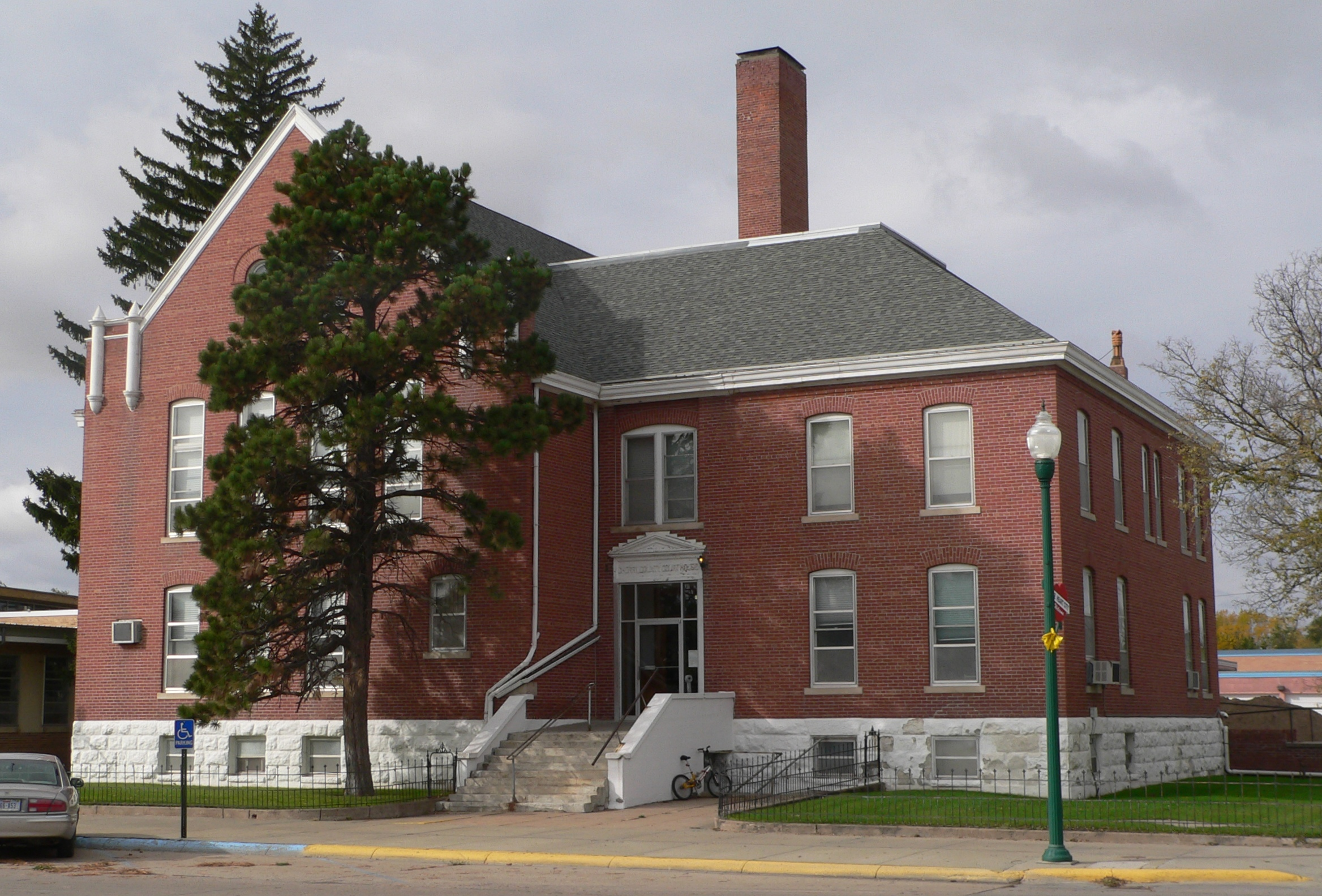
- The Cherry County Courthouse in Valentine

- Flag

- Location within the U.S. state of Nebraska
- Coordinates: 42.571323°N 101.047653°W
- Country: United States
- State: Nebraska
- Founded: February 23, 1883
- Named for: Samuel A. Cherry
- Seat: Valentine
- Largest city: Valentine

Area
  - Total: 6,009.595 sq mi (15,564.78 km^{2})
  - Land: 5,960.099 sq mi (15,436.59 km^{2})
  - Water: 49.496 sq mi (128.19 km^{2}) 0.82%

Population (2020)
  - Total: 5,455
  - Estimate (2025): 5,561 ▲
  - Density: 0.9153/sq mi (0.3534/km^{2})

Time zones
- Eastern part of county: UTC−6 (Central)
  - Summer (DST): UTC−5 (CDT)
- Western part of county: UTC−7 (Mountain)
  - Summer (DST): UTC−6 (MDT)
- Area code: 308, 402, and 531
- Congressional district: 3rd
- Website: cherrycountyne.gov
- • Nebraska county number 16 • Nebraska license plate prefix 66

Cherry County is a county in the U.S. state of Nebraska. As of the 2020 census, the population was 5,455, and was estimated to be 5,561 in 2025. The county seat and the largest city is Valentine.

In the Nebraska license plate system, Cherry County was represented by the prefix "66" (as it had the 66th-largest number of vehicles registered in the state when the license plate system was established in 1922).

== History ==
Cherry County was created on February 23, 1883 and named for Lt. Samuel A. Cherry, an Army officer who was stationed at Fort Niobrara and was killed in South Dakota in 1881. Cherry County is in the Nebraska Sandhills. It is the state's largest county, at nearly 6,000 square miles (16,000 km^{2}), larger than three states, Rhode Island, Delaware and Connecticut.

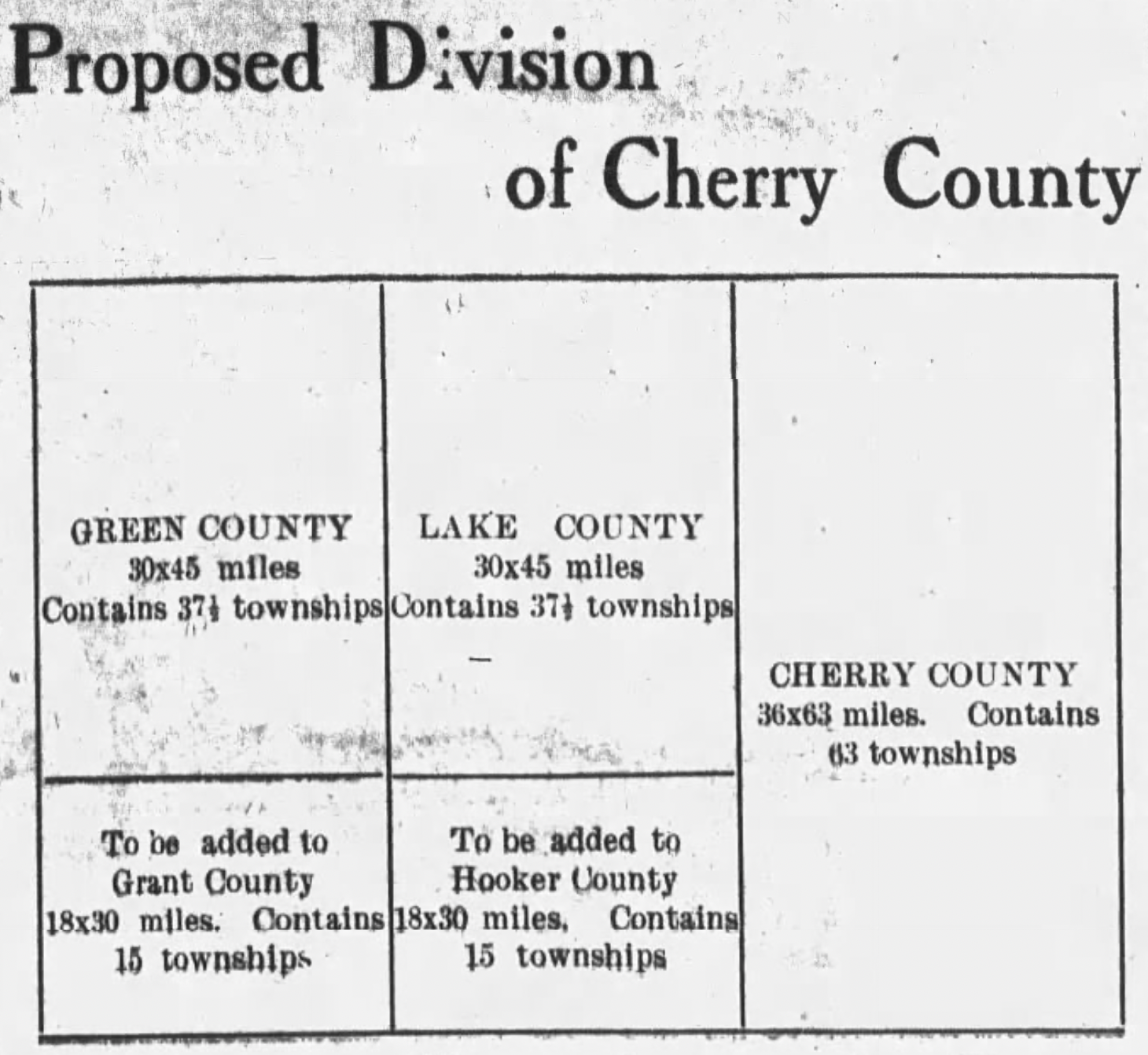
A map showing the proposed division

On November 3, 1911, Cherry County held a referendum that asked whether voters wanted to split the county into 5 different sections. The measure proposed that the western 60 miles were cut from the county, and divided as follows: the 60 miles is split in half into 30 mile strips, with 18 miles being taken from the south of those strips and given to Grant and Hooker Counties. The remaining northern parts would create two new counties: Lake and Green. The proposal failed, receiving 390 votes in favor, and 1,368 against. Unofficial precinct results detail that it succeeded in only 3 of the county's 42 precincts. A map of the proposed changes can be viewed below (or above, if viewed from mobile):

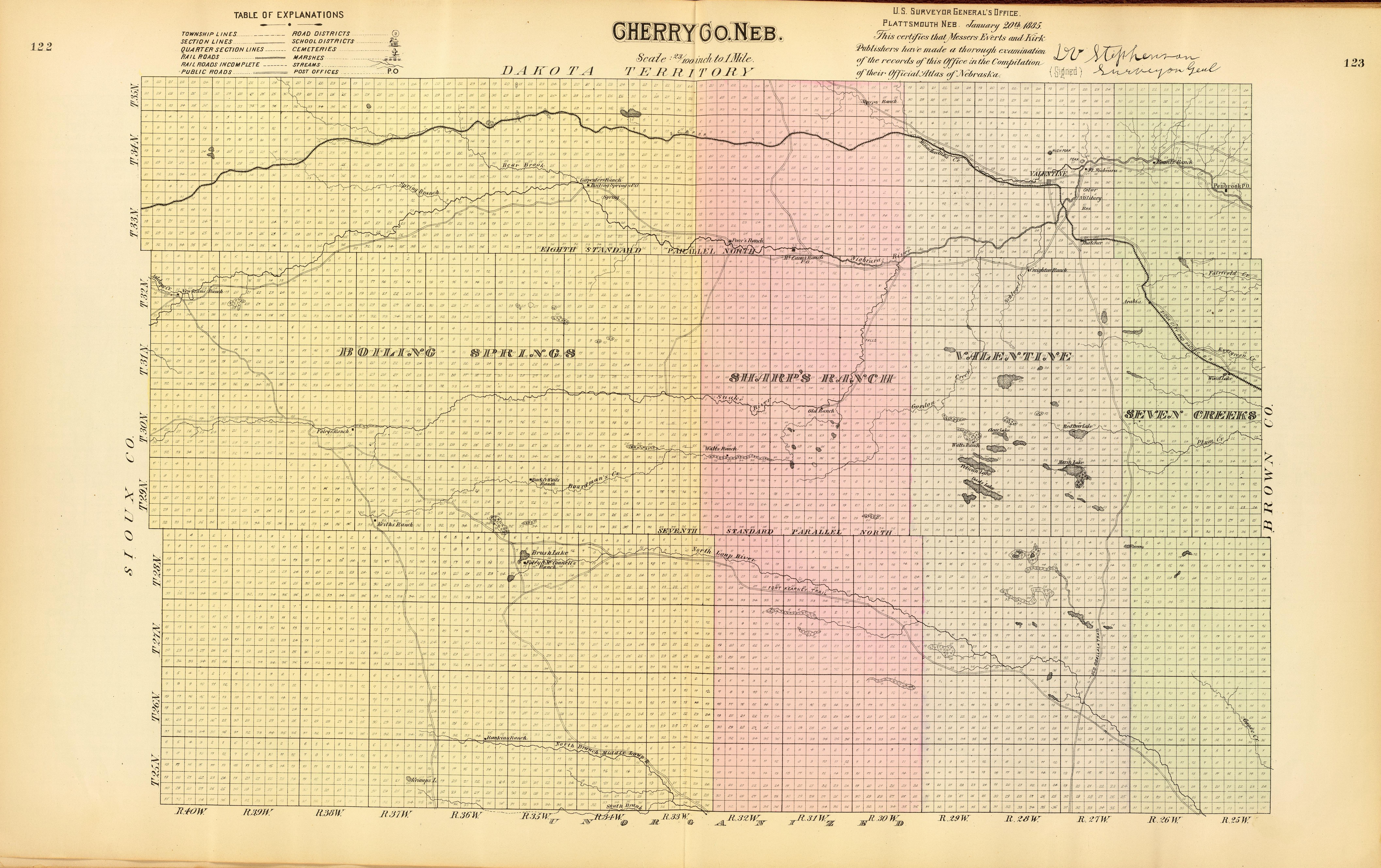
Map of 1885, with subdivision into:
• Boiling Springs
• Sharp's Ranch
• Valentine
• Seven Creeks

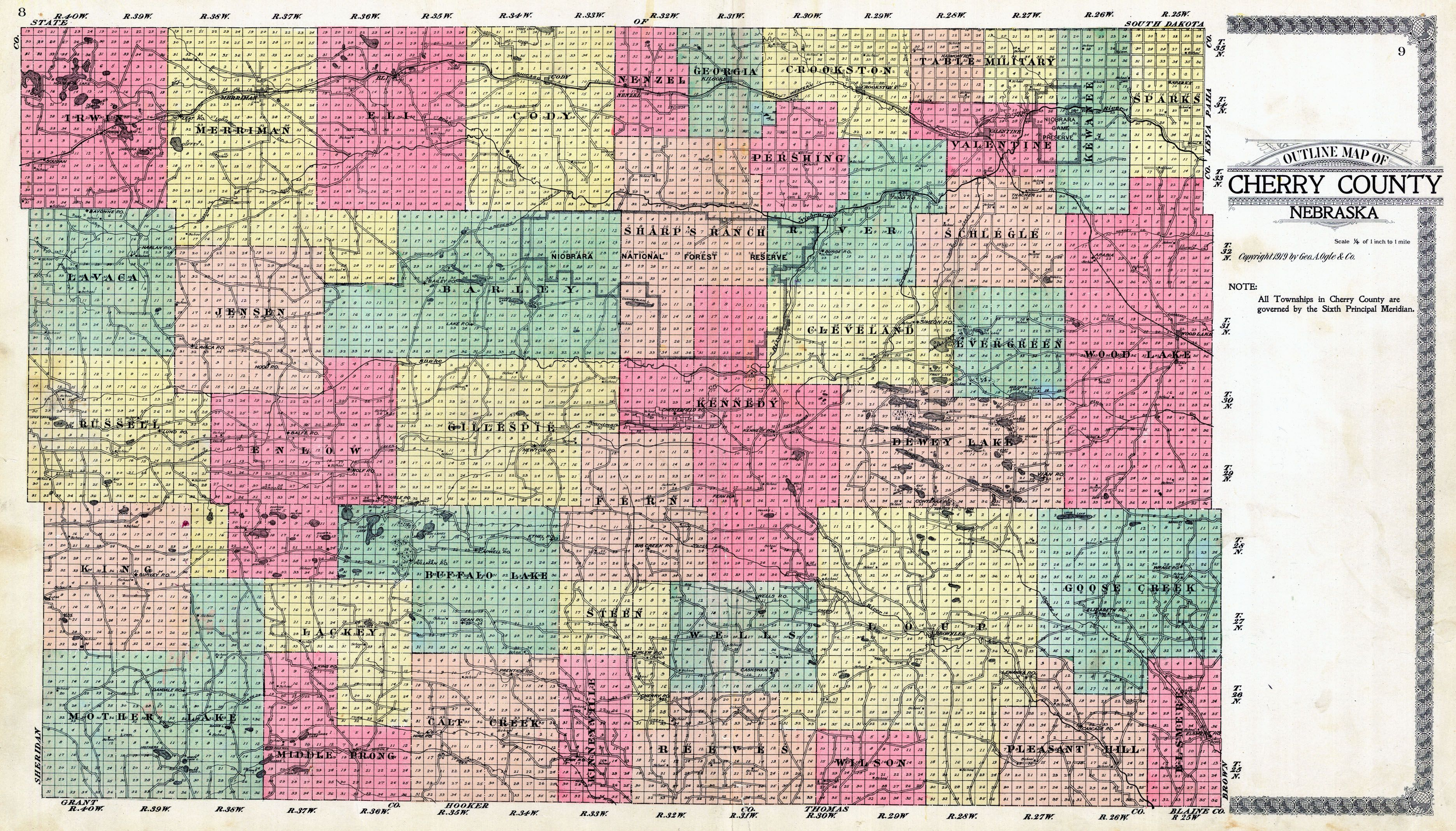
Map of 1919, with subdivision into precincts

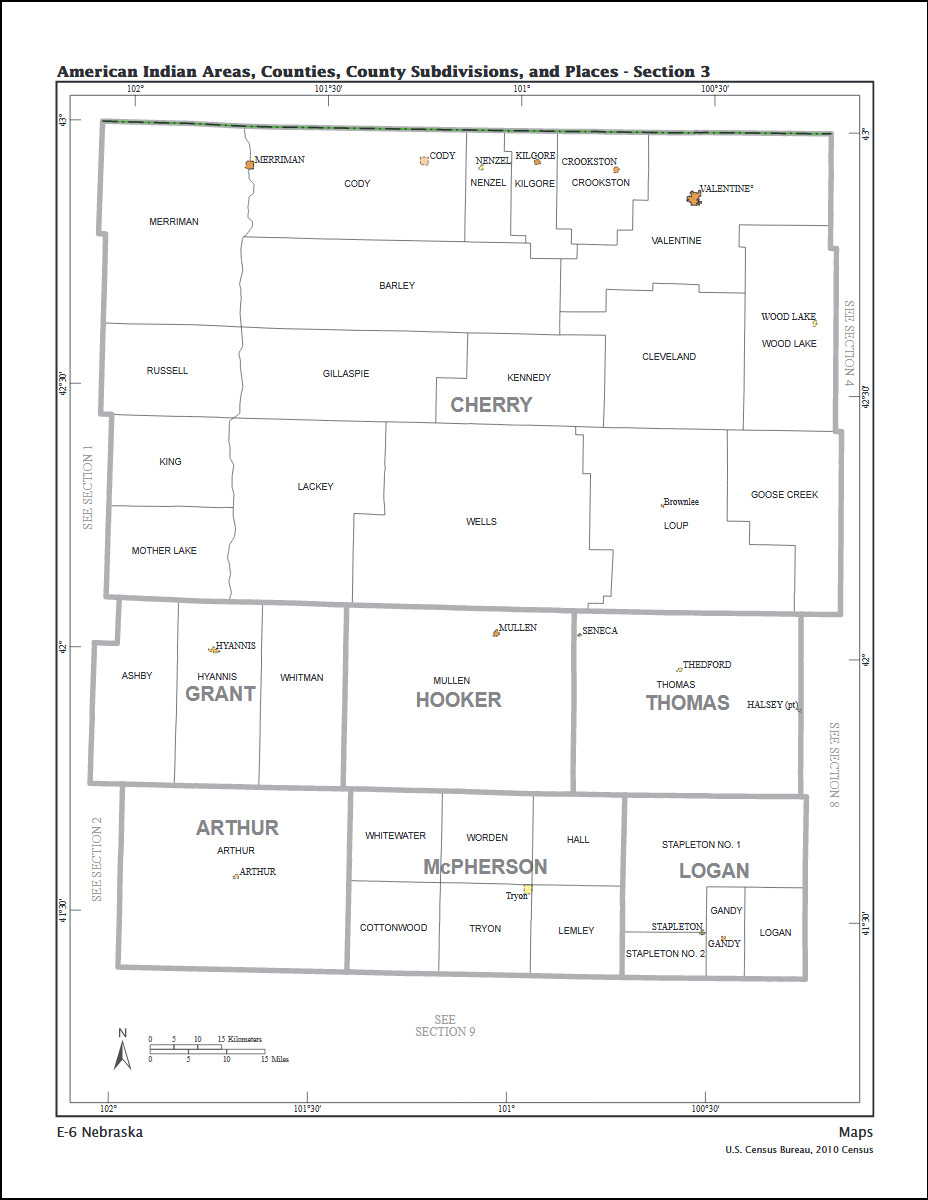
precincts of 2010 (Cherry County in upper part of map)

== Geography ==
Cherry County lies on the north side of Nebraska. Its north boundary line abuts the south boundary line of South Dakota.

According to the United States Census Bureau, the county has a total area of 6,009.595 square miles (15,564.78 km^{2}), of which 5,960.099 square miles (15,436.59 km^{2}) is land and 49.496 square miles (128.19 km^{2}) (0.82%) is water. It is the largest county in Nebraska by total area.

It is by far Nebraska's largest county in land area and larger than the state of Connecticut, or the states of Delaware and Rhode Island combined. The county is in Nebraska's Sandhills region; the dunes that give the region its name are a result of the most recent glacial period, the Pinedale glaciation. During the Holocene glacial retreat, the dunes, which had been deposited by the vast continental glaciers, were exposed, and grasses eventually took over.

=== Major highways ===
- U.S. Highway 20
- U.S. Highway 83
- Nebraska Highway 12
- Nebraska Highway 61
- Nebraska Highway 97

=== National protected areas ===
- Fort Niobrara National Wildlife Refuge
  - Fort Niobrara Wilderness
- Niobrara National Scenic River (part)
- Samuel R. McKelvie National Forest
- Valentine National Wildlife Refuge

=== State protected areas ===
- Bowring Ranch State Historical Park
- Cottonwood Lake State Recreation Area
- Merritt Reservoir State Recreation Area
- Smith Falls State Park

=== Adjacent counties ===
Flag of Cherry County, as decided sometime in 2019-21

Nebraska's largest county by area, Cherry County borders 11 counties, more than any other county in Nebraska. Seven of them are in Nebraska and four in South Dakota. The adjacent counties are:

- Bennett County, South Dakota – north
- Todd County, South Dakota – north
- Tripp County, South Dakota – northeast
- Brown County – east
- Keya Paha County – east
- Blaine County – southeast
- Grant County – south
- Thomas County – south
- Hooker County – south
- Sheridan County – west
- Oglala Lakota County, South Dakota – northwest

== Demographics ==
Historical population
Census	Pop.	Note	%±
1890	6,428		—
1900	6,541		1.8%
1910	10,414		59.2%
1920	11,753		12.9%
1930	10,898		−7.3%
1940	9,637		−11.6%
1950	8,397		−12.9%
1960	8,218		−2.1%
1970	6,846		−16.7%
1980	6,758		−1.3%
1990	6,307		−6.7%
2000	6,148		−2.5%
2010	5,713		−7.1%
2020	5,455		−4.5%
2025 (est.)	5,561	▲	1.9%
U.S. Decennial Census; 1790–1960 1900–1990; 1990–2000 2010–2020

As of the third quarter of 2025, the median home value in Cherry County was $151,729.

As of the 2024 American Community Survey, there are 2,233 estimated households in Cherry County with an average of 2.41 persons per household. The county has a median household income of $66,270. Approximately 8.3% of the county's population lives at or below the poverty line. Cherry County has an estimated 66.9% employment rate, with 25.3% of the population holding a bachelor's degree or higher and 96.2% holding a high school diploma. There were 3,009 housing units at an average density of 0.51 per square mile (0.2/km^{2}).

The top five reported languages (people were allowed to report up to two languages, thus the figures will generally add to more than 100%) were English (94.4%), Spanish (3.3%), Indo-European (0.3%), Asian and Pacific Islander (1.8%), and Other (0.2%).

The median age in the county was 41.4 years.

Cherry County, Nebraska – racial and ethnic composition Note: the US Census treats Hispanic/Latino as an ethnic category. This table excludes Latinos from the racial categories and assigns them to a separate category. Hispanics/Latinos may be of any race.
Race / ethnicity (NH = non-Hispanic)	Pop. 1980	Pop. 1990	Pop. 2000	Pop. 2010	Pop. 2020
White alone (NH)	6,627 (98.06%)	6,091 (96.58%)	5,769 (93.84%)	5,141 (89.99%)	4,772 (87.48%)
Black or African American alone (NH)	1 (0.01%)	2 (0.03%)	4 (0.07%)	11 (0.19%)	11 (0.20%)
Native American or Alaska Native alone (NH)	90 (1.33%)	176 (2.79%)	195 (3.17%)	310 (5.43%)	271 (4.97%)
Asian alone (NH)	10 (0.15%)	14 (0.22%)	24 (0.39%)	20 (0.35%)	7 (0.13%)
Pacific Islander alone (NH)	—	—	1 (0.02%)	1 (0.02%)	0 (0.00%)
Other race alone (NH)	8 (0.12%)	0 (0.00%)	1 (0.02%)	0 (0.00%)	7 (0.13%)
Mixed race or multiracial (NH)	—	—	97 (1.58%)	135 (2.36%)	239 (4.38%)
Hispanic or Latino (any race)	22 (0.33%)	24 (0.38%)	57 (0.93%)	95 (1.66%)	148 (2.71%)
Total	6,758 (100.00%)	6,307 (100.00%)	6,148 (100.00%)	5,713 (100.00%)	5,455 (100.00%)

=== 2024 estimate ===
As of the 2024 estimate, there were 5,558 people, 2,233 households, and _ families residing in the county. The population density was 0.93 inhabitants per square mile (0.4/km^{2}). There were 3,009 housing units at an average density of 0.51 per square mile (0.2/km^{2}). The racial makeup of the county was 86.8% White (83.4% NH White), 0.6% African American, 7.5% Native American, 0.6% Asian, 0.1% Pacific Islander, _% from some other races and 4.4% from two or more races. Hispanic or Latino people of any race were 4.9% of the population.

=== 2020 census ===
As of the 2020 census, there were 5,455 people, 2,427 households, and 1,510 families residing in the county. The population density was 0.92 inhabitants per square mile (0.4/km^{2}). There were 2,979 housing units at an average density of 0.50 per square mile (0.2/km^{2}). The racial makeup of the county was 88.54% White, 0.20% African American, 5.35% Native American, 0.13% Asian, 0.00% Pacific Islander, 0.64% from some other races and 5.13% from two or more races. Hispanic or Latino people of any race were 2.71% of the population.

There were 2,427 households in the county, of which 27.0% had children under the age of 18 living with them and 22.2% had a female householder with no spouse or partner present. About 34.8% of all households were made up of individuals and 16.4% had someone living alone who was 65 years of age or older.

The median age was 43.4 years. 22.4% of residents were under the age of 18 and 22.9% of residents were 65 years of age or older. For every 100 females there were 100.8 males, and for every 100 females age 18 and over there were 101.4 males age 18 and over.

0.0% of residents lived in urban areas, while 100.0% lived in rural areas.

There were 2,979 housing units, of which 18.5% were vacant. Among occupied housing units, 65.1% were owner-occupied and 34.9% were renter-occupied. The homeowner vacancy rate was 1.7% and the rental vacancy rate was 11.1%.

=== 2010 census ===
As of the 2010 census, there were 5,713 people, 2,530 households, and 1,634 families residing in the county. The population density was 0.96 inhabitants per square mile (0.4/km^{2}). There were 3,157 housing units at an average density of 0.53 per square mile (0.2/km^{2}). The racial makeup of the county was 90.67% White, 0.23% African American, 5.86% Native American, 0.35% Asian, 0.02% Pacific Islander, 0.40% from some other races and 2.47% from two or more races. Hispanic or Latino people of any race were 1.66% of the population.

=== 2000 census ===
As of the 2000 census, there were 6,148 people, 2,508 households, and 1,710 families residing in the county. The population density was 1.03 inhabitants per square mile (0.4/km^{2}). There were 3,220 housing units at an average density of 0.54 per square mile (0.2/km^{2}). The racial makeup of the county was 94.19% White, 0.07% African American, 3.25% Native American, 0.42% Asian, 0.02% Pacific Islander, 0.33% from some other races and 1.72% from two or more races. Hispanic or Latino people of any race were 0.93% of the population. 38.5% were of German, 12.6% English, 11.1% Irish and 7.3% American ancestry.

There were 2,508 households, out of which 31.70% had children under the age of 18 living with them, 57.90% were married couples living together, 6.90% had a female householder with no husband present, and 31.80% were non-families. 28.90% of all households were made up of individuals, and 12.70% had someone living alone who was 65 years of age or older. The average household size was 2.42 and the average family size was 2.98.

The county population contained 27.00% under the age of 18, 6.20% from 18 to 24, 25.50% from 25 to 44, 24.00% from 45 to 64, and 17.30% who were 65 years of age or older. The median age was 39 years. For every 100 females there were 98.80 males. For every 100 females age 18 and over, there were 93.60 males.

The median income for a household in the county was $29,268, and the median income for a family was $36,500. Males had a median income of $23,705 versus $17,277 for females. The per capita income for the county was $15,943. About 9.60% of families and 12.30% of the population were below the poverty line, including 13.40% of those under age 18 and 14.20% of those age 65 or over.

== Communities ==
=== City ===
- Valentine (county seat)

=== Villages ===
- Cody
- Crookston
- Kilgore
- Merriman
- Nenzel
- Wood Lake

=== Census-designated place ===
- Brownlee

=== Other unincorporated communities ===
- Barley
- DeWitty
- Elsmere
- Sparks
- Thatcher

=== Notable ranches ===
- Abbott Ranch
- Bowring Ranch
- Spade Ranch
- Sunny Slope Ranch

== Time zones ==
Cherry County residents observe two time zones, Central and Mountain. The eastern third of the county, including county seat Valentine, is in the Central Time Zone, while the western two thirds, including Merriman, are in the Mountain Time Zone.

== Politics ==
Cherry County voters are reliably Republican. The county has not voted for a Democrat in a presidential election since Franklin D. Roosevelt's 1936 landslide, and even then, the county was decided by less than four points. Republicans have carried the county by a double-digit margin in every presidential election since, and no Democratic nominee since Harry S. Truman in 1948 has even mustered 40% of the vote.

Political Party	Number of registered voters (March 1, 2026)	Percent
Republican	2,968	81.07%
Independent	364	9.94%
Democratic	286	7.81%
Libertarian	28	0.76%
Legal Marijuana Now	15	0.41%
Total	3,661	100.00%

United States presidential election results for Cherry County, Nebraska
Year	Republican		Democratic		Third party(ies)	
Year	No.	%	No.	%	No.	%
1900	922	55.24%	698	41.82%	49	2.94%
1904	978	66.94%	325	22.25%	158	10.81%
1908	1,048	48.34%	1,021	47.09%	99	4.57%
1912	679	25.90%	1,047	39.93%	896	34.17%
1916	1,091	36.44%	1,734	57.92%	169	5.64%
1920	1,636	66.37%	711	28.84%	118	4.79%
1924	1,663	43.69%	1,169	30.71%	974	25.59%
1928	2,905	69.04%	1,285	30.54%	18	0.43%
1932	1,754	37.30%	2,912	61.92%	37	0.79%
1936	1,874	47.58%	2,010	51.03%	55	1.40%
1940	2,705	60.30%	1,781	39.70%	0	0.00%
1944	2,314	62.80%	1,371	37.20%	0	0.00%
1948	2,141	58.93%	1,492	41.07%	0	0.00%
1952	3,148	76.63%	960	23.37%	0	0.00%
1956	2,414	73.20%	884	26.80%	0	0.00%
1960	2,695	72.08%	1,044	27.92%	0	0.00%
1964	2,244	61.11%	1,428	38.89%	0	0.00%
1968	2,199	73.23%	582	19.38%	222	7.39%
1972	2,610	84.93%	463	15.07%	0	0.00%
1976	2,197	68.83%	906	28.38%	89	2.79%
1980	2,517	79.78%	489	15.50%	149	4.72%
1984	2,720	85.05%	463	14.48%	15	0.47%
1988	2,240	77.35%	642	22.17%	14	0.48%
1992	1,707	56.75%	563	18.72%	738	24.53%
1996	1,905	68.04%	551	19.68%	344	12.29%
2000	2,322	81.56%	446	15.67%	79	2.77%
2004	2,509	82.48%	483	15.88%	50	1.64%
2008	2,360	77.15%	599	19.58%	100	3.27%
2012	2,557	83.45%	436	14.23%	71	2.32%
2016	2,623	84.12%	317	10.17%	178	5.71%
2020	2,844	87.00%	373	11.41%	52	1.59%
2024	2,687	87.30%	349	11.34%	42	1.36%

== Education ==
School districts include:

- Cody-Kilgore Public Schools #30, Cody
- Gordon-Rushville Public Schools #10, Gordon
- Hyannis Area Schools #11, Hyannis
- Mullen Public Schools #1, Mullen
- Thedford Public Schools #1, Thedford
- Valentine Community Schools #6, Valentine

== See also ==
- National Register of Historic Places listings in Cherry County, Nebraska
- Lt. Samuel A. Cherry
