= Louse Creek (Niobrara River tributary) =

Stream in Nebraska, U.S.

Louse Creek Tributary to Niobrara River
- Location of Louse Creek mouth Louse Creek (Niobrara River tributary) (the United States)

Location
- Country: United States
- State: Nebraska
- County: Holt

Physical characteristics
- Source: confluence of East and West Branches of Louse Creek
  - location: about 4 miles west of Dorsey, Nebraska
  - coordinates: 42°40′44.00″N 098°26′18.29″W
  - elevation: 1,705 ft (520 m)
- Mouth: Niobrara River
  - location: about 0.5 miles north-northeast of Redbird, Nebraska
  - coordinates: 42°46′14.00″N 098°26′16.29″W
  - elevation: 1,398 ft (426 m)
- Length: 8.19 mi (13.18 km)
- Basin size: 24.45 square miles (63.3 km^{2})
- Discharge
  - location: Niobrara River
  - average: 2.84 cu ft/s (0.080 m^{3}/s) at mouth with Niobrara River

Basin features
- Progression: Niobrara River → Missouri River → Mississippi River → Gulf of Mexico
- River system: Niobrara
- Tributaries
  - left: West Branch Louse Creek
  - right: East Branch Louse Creek
- Bridges: 887th Road, 888th Road, 893rd Road

Louse Creek is a 8.29 mi (13.34 km) long third-order tributary to the Niobrara River in Holt County, Nebraska.

== Course ==
Louse Creek begins at the confluence of East and West Branches of Louse Creek about 4 miles (6.4 km) west of Dorsey, Nebraska in Holt County and then flows generally north-northwest to join the Niobrara River about 0.5 miles (0.80 km) north-northeast of Redbird, Nebraska.

== Watershed ==
Louse Creek drains 24.45 square miles (63.3 km^{2}) of area, receives about 24.9 in/year (63 cm/year) of precipitation, and is about 4.18% forested.

== See also ==
- List of rivers of Nebraska
