= East Branch Louse Creek =

Stream in Nebraska, U.S.

East Branch Louse Creek Tributary to Louse Creek
- Location of East Branch Louse Creek mouth East Branch Louse Creek (the United States)

Location
- Country: United States
- State: Nebraska
- County: Holt

Physical characteristics
- Source: Steel Creek divide
  - location: about 4 miles southwest of Dorsey, Nebraska
  - coordinates: 42°39′8.00″N 098°24′32.00″W
  - elevation: 1,890 ft (580 m)
- Mouth: Louse Creek
  - location: about 4 miles west of Dorsey, Nebraska
  - coordinates: 42°40′43.00″N 098°26′18.29″W
  - elevation: 1,706 ft (520 m)
- Length: 2.79 mi (4.49 km)
- Basin size: 5.56 square miles (14.4 km^{2})
- Discharge
  - location: Louse Creek
  - average: 0.73 cu ft/s (0.021 m^{3}/s) at mouth with Louse Creek

Basin features
- Progression: Louse Creek → Niobrara River → Missouri River → Mississippi River → Gulf of Mexico
- River system: Niobrara

East Branch Louse Creek is a 2.79 mi (4.49 km) long second-order tributary to Louse Creek in Holt County, Nebraska. The confluence of this creek with West Branch Louse Creek forms Louse Creek.

== Course ==
East Branch Louse Creek rises on the Steel Creek divide about 4 miles (6.4 km) southwest of Dorsey, Nebraska in Holt County and then flows northwest to join West Branch Louse Creek and forms Louse Creek about 4 miles (6.4 km) west of Dorsey, Nebraska.

== Watershed ==
East Branch Louse Creek drains 5.56 square miles (14.4 km^{2}) of area, receives about 24.9 in/year (63 cm/year) of precipitation, and is about 0.05% forested.

== See also ==
- List of rivers of Nebraska
