= Middle Branch Eagle Creek =

Stream in Nebraska, U.S.

Middle Branch Eagle Creek Tributary to Eagle Creek
- Location of Middle Branch Eagle Creek mouth Middle Branch Eagle Creek (the United States)

Location
- Country: United States
- State: Nebraska
- County: Holt

Physical characteristics
- Source: confluence of East and Middle Branch of Eagle Creek
  - location: about 3 miles east of Atkinson, Nebraska
  - coordinates: 42°32′24.01″N 098°54′2.34″W
  - elevation: 2,092 ft (638 m)
- Mouth: Eagle Creek
  - location: about 2.5 miles southeast of School No. 33
  - coordinates: 42°38′31.01″N 098°45′25.32″W
  - elevation: 1,768 ft (539 m)
- Length: 14.50 mi (23.34 km)
- Basin size: 74.76 square miles (193.6 km^{2})
- Discharge
  - location: Eagle Creek
  - average: 8.26 cu ft/s (0.234 m^{3}/s) at mouth with Eagle Creek

Basin features
- Progression: Eagle Creek → Niobrara River → Missouri River → Mississippi
- River system: Niobrara
- Tributaries
  - left: North Branch Eagle Creek
- Bridges: 878th Road, 480th Avenue, 879th Road, 483rd Avenue, 882nd Road, 485th Avenue, 486th Avenue

Middle Branch Eagle Creek is a 14.50 mi (23.34 km) long second-order tributary to Eagle Creek in Holt County, Nebraska.

== Course ==
Middle Branch Eagle Creek rises on the Elkhorn River divide 3 miles (4.8 km) east of Atkinson, Nebraska in Holt County and then flows northeast to join East Branch Eagle Creek forming Eagle Creek about 2.5 miles (4.0 km) southeast of School No. 33.

== Watershed ==
Middle Branch Eagle Creek drains 74.76 square miles (193.6 km^{2}) of area, receives about 24.6 in/year (62 cm/year) of precipitation, and is about 0.71% forested.

== See also ==
- List of rivers of Nebraska
