= Camp Creek (Eagle Creek tributary) =

Stream in Nebraska, U.S.

Camp Creek Tributary to Eagle Creek
- Location of Camp Creek mouth Camp Creek (Eagle Creek tributary) (the United States)

Location
- Country: United States
- State: Nebraska
- County: Holt

Physical characteristics
- Source: Blackbird Creek divide
  - location: about 1.5 miles east of School No. 150
  - coordinates: 42°37′17.01″N 098°40′10.31″W
  - elevation: 1,982 ft (604 m)
- Mouth: Eagle Creek
  - location: about 0.5 miles southwest of School No. 208
  - coordinates: 42°44′10.02″N 098°36′58.31″W
  - elevation: 1,529 ft (466 m)
- Length: 10.79 mi (17.36 km)
- Basin size: 17.31 square miles (44.8 km^{2})
- Discharge
  - location: Eagle Creek
  - average: 2.04 cu ft/s (0.058 m^{3}/s) at mouth with Eagle Creek

Basin features
- Progression: Eagle Creek → Niobrara River → Missouri River → Mississippi
- River system: Niobrara
- Bridges: 883rd Road, US 281, 885th Road, 886th Road, 887th Road, 888th Road

Camp Creek is a 10.79 mi (17.36 km) long second-order tributary to Eagle Creek in Holt County, Nebraska.

== Course ==
Camp Creek rises on the Blackbird Creek divide about 1.5 miles (2.4 km) east of School No. 150 in Holt County and then flows generally north to join Eagle Creek about 0.5 miles (0.80 km) southwest of School No. 208.

== Watershed ==
Camp Creek drains 17.31 square miles (44.8 km^{2}) of area, receives about 24.7 in/year (63 cm/year) of precipitation, and is about 5.16% forested.

== See also ==
- List of rivers of Nebraska
