= Turkey Creek (Niobrara River tributary) =

Stream in Nebraska, U.S.

Turkey Creek Tributary to Niobrara River
- Location of Turkey Creek mouth Turkey Creek (Niobrara River tributary) (the United States)

Location
- Country: United States
- State: Nebraska
- County: Holt

Physical characteristics
- Source: Brush Creek and Elkhorn River divide
  - location: about 1.5 miles southeast of School No. 147
  - coordinates: 42°41′15.01″N 098°50′5.33″W
  - elevation: 2,030 ft (620 m)
- Mouth: Niobrara River
  - location: about 0.5 miles east of Anncar, Nebraska
  - coordinates: 42°48′10.00″N 098°43′1.31″W
  - elevation: 1,516 ft (462 m)
- Length: 15.57 mi (25.06 km)
- Basin size: 21.84 square miles (56.6 km^{2})
- Discharge
  - location: Niobrara River
  - average: 2.57 cu ft/s (0.073 m^{3}/s) at mouth with Niobrara River

Basin features
- Progression: Niobrara River → Missouri River → Mississippi
- River system: Niobrara
- Bridges: 890th Road, 485th Avenue

Turkey Creek is a 15.57 mi (25.06 km) long first-order tributary to the Niobrara River in Holt County, Nebraska.

Turkey Creek rises on the Brush Creek and Elkhorn River divides about 1.5 miles (2.4 km) southeast of School No. 147 in Holt County and then flows generally north-northeast to join the Niobrara River about 0.5 miles (0.80 km) east of Anncar, Nebraska.

== Watershed ==
Turkey Creek drains 21.84 square miles (56.6 km^{2}) of area, receives about 24.7 in/year (63 cm/year) of precipitation, and is about 5.59% forested.

== See also ==
- List of rivers of Nebraska
