= List of Ohio tornadoes =

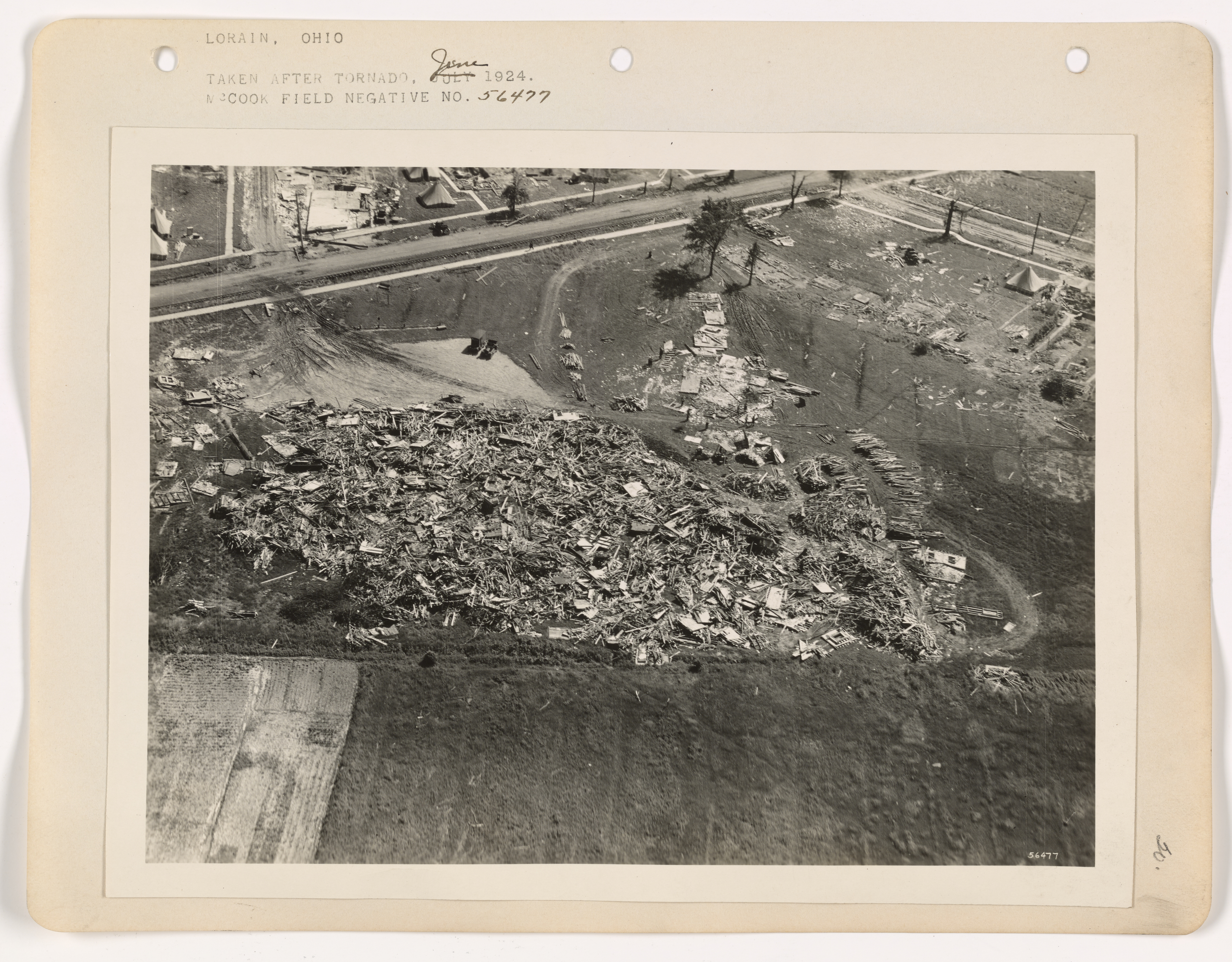
Tornado damage in Lorain, Ohio

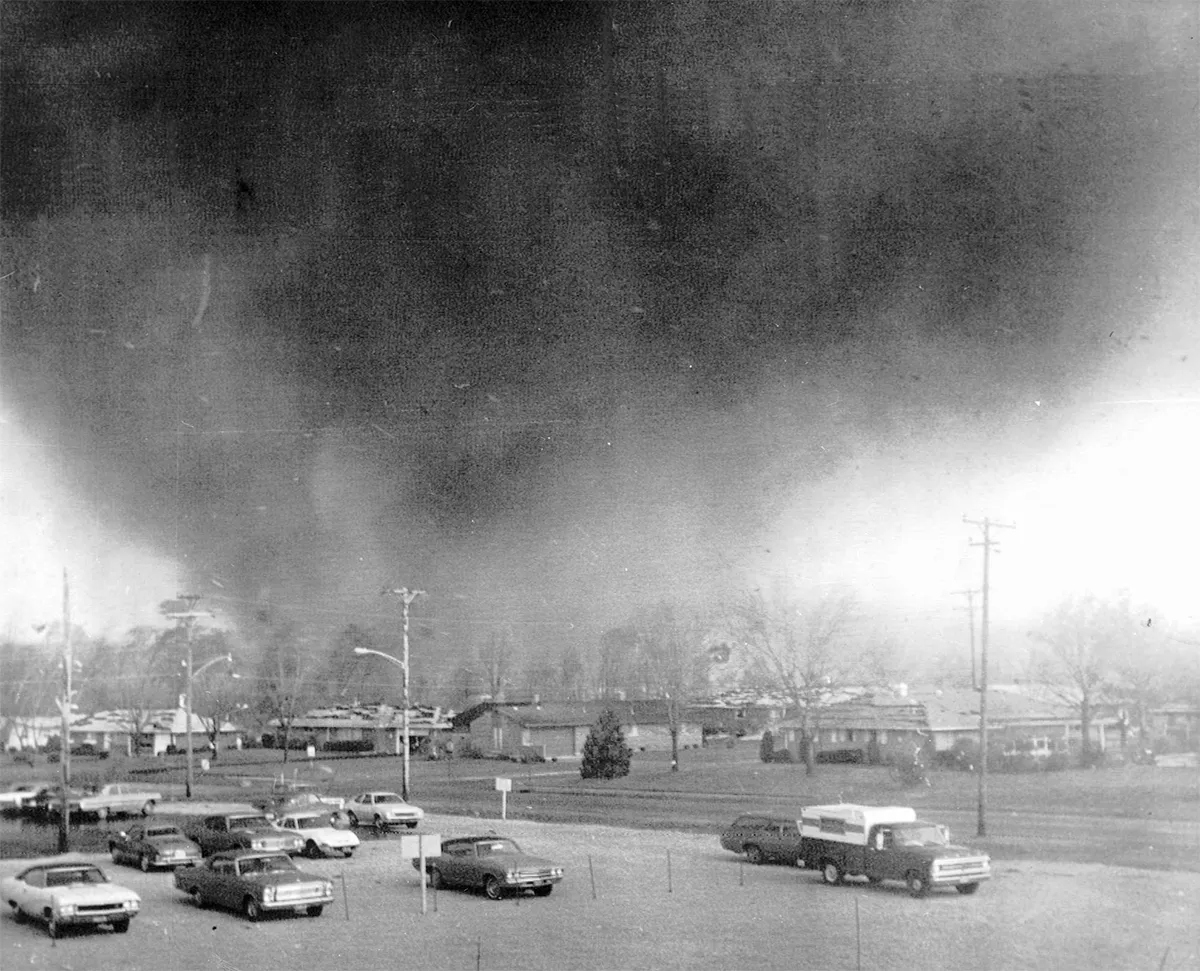
The Xenia, Ohio tornado from the 1974 Super Outbreak. This tornado was rated by Ted Fujita himself as an F6, but it was retroactively downgraded to F5

Tornadoes in the state of Ohio are relatively uncommon, with roughly 16 tornadoes touching down every year since 1804, the year with the first recorded event in the state. Many of Ohio's tornadoes are violent, and there have been four recorded F5 or EF5 Tornadoes in Ohio's history.

== Climatology ==
Ohio's climate is relatively mild, and is only ideal for the formation of tornadoes during certain times of the year, especially February and March. Warm air from the Southern United States can reach up into the Ohio Valley, resulting in tornadic storms. Ohio's proximity to Lake Erie also results in cold air moving toward the Ohio Valley, creating the "hot-cold" effect seen in the traditional Tornado Alley. Ohio has been a part of multiple large tornado outbreaks, the most notable being the 1974 Super Outbreak.

== Events ==
| FU | F0 | F1 | F2 | F3 | F4 | F5 |
|---|---|---|---|---|---|---|
| 1 | 0 | 0 | 3 | 4 | 3 | 0 |

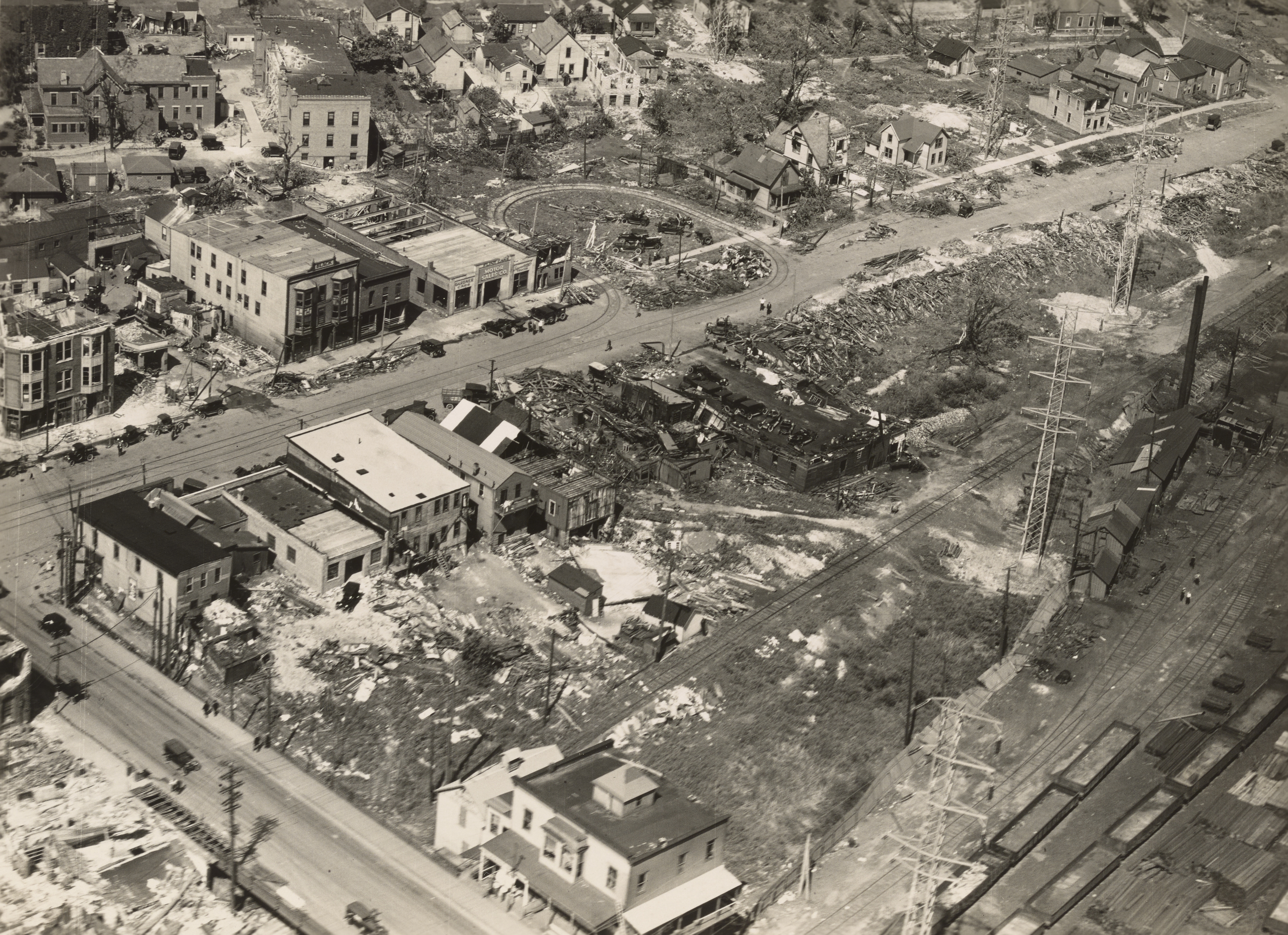
Damage from the June 28, 1924 Lorain-Sandusky F4 tornado

=== Pre-1950 ===
- August 1804 – The first-ever confirmed tornado touched down in Geauga County at an unknown intensity.
- February 4, 1842 – A violent tornado impacted the communities of Mayfield and Kirtland in northeastern Ohio, destroying dozens of houses and killing at least 2.
- March 28, 1920 – An F4 tornado touched down in Wells County in Indiana, before crossing the Indiana-Ohio state line into Paulding County. Several homes were destroyed, and a small store was hit, killing 6. It also moved through Fulton County, hitting Swanton, completely destroying multiple small businesses and homes. In total, 23 were killed, 54 were injured, and the tornado caused an estimated $1,000,000 (1920 USD) in damages. Another F4 tornado touched down in Jay County in Indiana, before tracking into Mercer and Van Wert counties. The tornado killed 17 and injured 70, and multiple houses were completely destroyed. An FU tornado touched down in Grand Lake St. Marys, causing only minor damage and injuring several hikers. A tornado touched down near Bowling Green, inflicting F2 damage to an estimated 36 homes and killing 2 people. An F3 tornado that initially formed and touched down in Wayne County in Indiana crossed the state line into Darke County, killing 5 and destroying 6 barns. A large and extremely violent F4 tornado caused extensive damage to Randolph County in Indiana before crossing into Darke County, killing 8 people who were sheltering in homes and causing an estimated $1,000,000 (1920 USD) in damages.
- June 28, 1924 – Multiple tornadoes touched down across northern Ohio, including two unrated tornadoes in Erie County and one in Portage County. An extremely powerful and violent F4 tornado hit Sandusky and Lorain, killing 85 and injuring over 300. The tornado destroyed bridges and homes in its path, and caused an estimated $12 million (1920 USD) in damages to roads and other structures.
- June 23, 1944 – A relatively brief and weak F2 tornado tracked through Portage County, inflicting damage to crops and houses. Several livestock were killed, but no injuries were reported.
- June 7, 1947 – A long tracked F4 affected areas from near Silver Lake in Summit County, through Vienna in Trumbull County before affecting Sharon across the state line in Pennsylvania. Six lives were lost and 340 were injured. ^{[11]}

| FU | F0 | F1 | F2 | F3 | F4 | F5 |
|---|---|---|---|---|---|---|
| 0 | 0 | 1 | 1 | 2 | 1 | 0 |

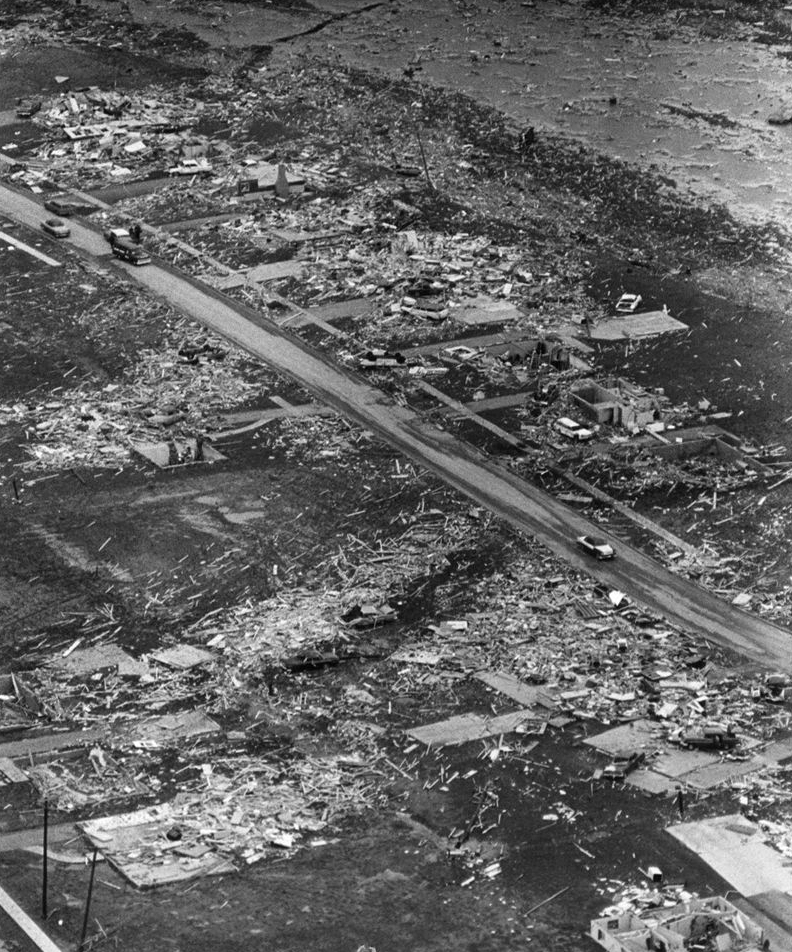
Damage from the April, 1965 F4 tornado in Toledo

=== 1950–1959 ===
- June 27, 1951 – A strong F2 tornado tracked through Butler County, hitting Jacksonburg and causing an estimated $2.5 million (1951 USD) in damages.
- May 24, 1952 – A brief F1 tornado was observed by multiple people as it tracked into Bedford, destroying road signs and heavily damaging houses.
- June 8, 1953 – An extremely powerful and long-tracked F4 tornado tracked through Henry, Wood, Sandusky, Erie, Lorain and Cuyahoga counties, destroying an estimated 110 homes and killing 17 people.
- November 15, 1955 – A long-tracked F3 tornado moved through Randolph County in Indiana before crossing into Darke County, damaging houses and injuring 8. The tornado caused $2.52 million (1955 USD) in damages.
- February 10, 1959 – An intense F3 tornado hit Sugar Tree Ridge, destroying 12 farms. A vehicle that took a direct hit from the tornado was thrown over 75 yards away, and a house caught fire as the tornado downed power lines. 6 people were injured, and the tornado caused $250,000 (1959 USD) in damages.

| FU | F0 | F1 | F2 | F3 | F4 | F5 |
|---|---|---|---|---|---|---|
| 1+ | 10+ | 12 | 4 | 3 | 9 | 1 |

=== 1960–1969 ===
- April 25, 1961 – A violent and long-tracked F4 tornado caused extensive damage in Western Indiana before crossing the state line into Preble County, destroying homes and other structures. 7 were injured and the tornado caused $12.5 million (1961 USD) in damages. A strong F2 tornado touched down in Blanchester, tracking through Clinton County. Two people were killed in separate barns near Martinsville, and 4 others were injured.
- May 6, 1961 – A long-tracked and violent F3 tornado tore through Steuben County in Indiana before crossing into Williams County. Homes and crops were destroyed, and five people were injured.
- May 8, 1961 – An F1 tornado touched down in Bethel, before damaging roofs and trees near White Oak. The tornado caused $2,500 (1961 USD) in damages, but caused no injuries. A multi-vortex tornado inflicted F1 damage to Tuscarawas, downing power lines and heavily damaging outbuildings and causing $25,000 (1961 USD) in damages.
- May 9, 1961 – A brief F1 tornado caused damage to a movie theater in Warsaw, and multiple barns were destroyed in rural Coshocton County.
- May 23, 1962 – A small but strong F1 tornado hit Aurora, destroying various buildings and causing a large power outage. The tornado caused an estimated $250,000 (1962 USD) in damages, but nobody was injured.
- May 26, 1962 – A brief F2 tornado tracked through Ross County, damaging a Y Drive Inn, two restaurants, and a service station. The tornado caused $25,000 (1962 USD) in damages, and no injuries were reported.
- April 11, 1965 – A violent F4 tornado initially touched down in Blackford and Adams counties in Indiana before crossing the state line into Mercer County, destroying an estimated 15 homes while killing 4 people. 125 people were injured and the tornado caused $52.750 million (1965 USD) in damages. Another F4 tornado tracked through Allen and Hancock counties, destroying farms and outbuildings. 13 people were killed, 104 were injured and the tornado inflicted $2.7 million (1965 USD) in damages. Shortly after the Allen-Hancock tornado had lifted, another F4 tornado touched down in Lucas County, flipping over a bus in Toledo and killing 5 people. 50 homes were destroyed and vehicles were tossed hundreds of yards as the tornado crossed into Monroe County in Michigan. In total, 18 people were killed and 237 were injured. An F4 tornado tracked through Shelby County, impacting farms in mainly rural areas but killing 3 people. 2 were injured when the tornado flipped over a trailer. An F3 tornado moved through Seneca County, destroying four homes and killing 4 people. A violent F4 tornado hit near Pittsfield, destroying multiple homes and other structures while killing 18 people. The tornado was estimated to have caused $50,000 (1965 USD) in damages. A brief F1 tornado touched down in Eaton, damaging a building. Another brief F1 tornado tracked through Medina County, heavily damaging multiple homes and injuring 6 people. A long-tracked F2 tornado moved through Union, Delaware and Morrow counties, destroying an estimated 25 homes and killing 4 farmers. A brief F1 tornado caused minor damage in areas near Cedarville, and no injuries were reported.
- April 12, 1965 – A long-tracked F1 tornado moved through Pickaway, Fairfield and Perry counties, destroying 12 mobile homes and injuring 13 people. The tornado caused an estimated $750,000 (1965 USD) in damages. A brief F1 tornado also touched down in Cadiz, causing minor damage to various buildings.
- April 23, 1968 – A long-tracked and intense F5 tornado tracked through Pendleton and Bracken counties in Kentucky, before crossing the state line into Brown County. Many homes were destroyed, and a farm was obliterated in Adams County. 6 people were killed and 364 were injured, and the tornado had F5 windspeeds at various points during its lifetime. Another large F4 tornado touched down near Glen Este, destroying 35 homes, 50 barns, and killing one person. The tornado caused a total of $7.5 million (1968 USD) in damages. A brief F1 tornado also touched down near Fayette, downing power lines and damaging trees. Another F1 tornado caused extensive damage in Licking County, causing $250,000 (1968 USD) in damages but injuring nobody. An F2 tornado tracked through Scioto County, directly impacting the Greater Portsmouth Regional Airport and damaging 12 aircraft. One person was injured and the tornado caused an estimated $250,000 (1968 USD) in damages. A long-tracked F5 tornado touched down in Greenup County in Kentucky before crossing state lines into Scioto and Lawrence counties. The tornado killed 7 people, and injured a further 93.
- May 15, 1968 – A brief F1 tornado touched down near Wooster, damaging farms and crops. Another F2 tornado touched down nearby, damaging various barns and outbuildings.

| FU | F0 | F1 | F2 | F3 | F4 | F5 |
|---|---|---|---|---|---|---|
| 10+ | 15+ | 7+ | 5 | 3 | 1 | 2 |

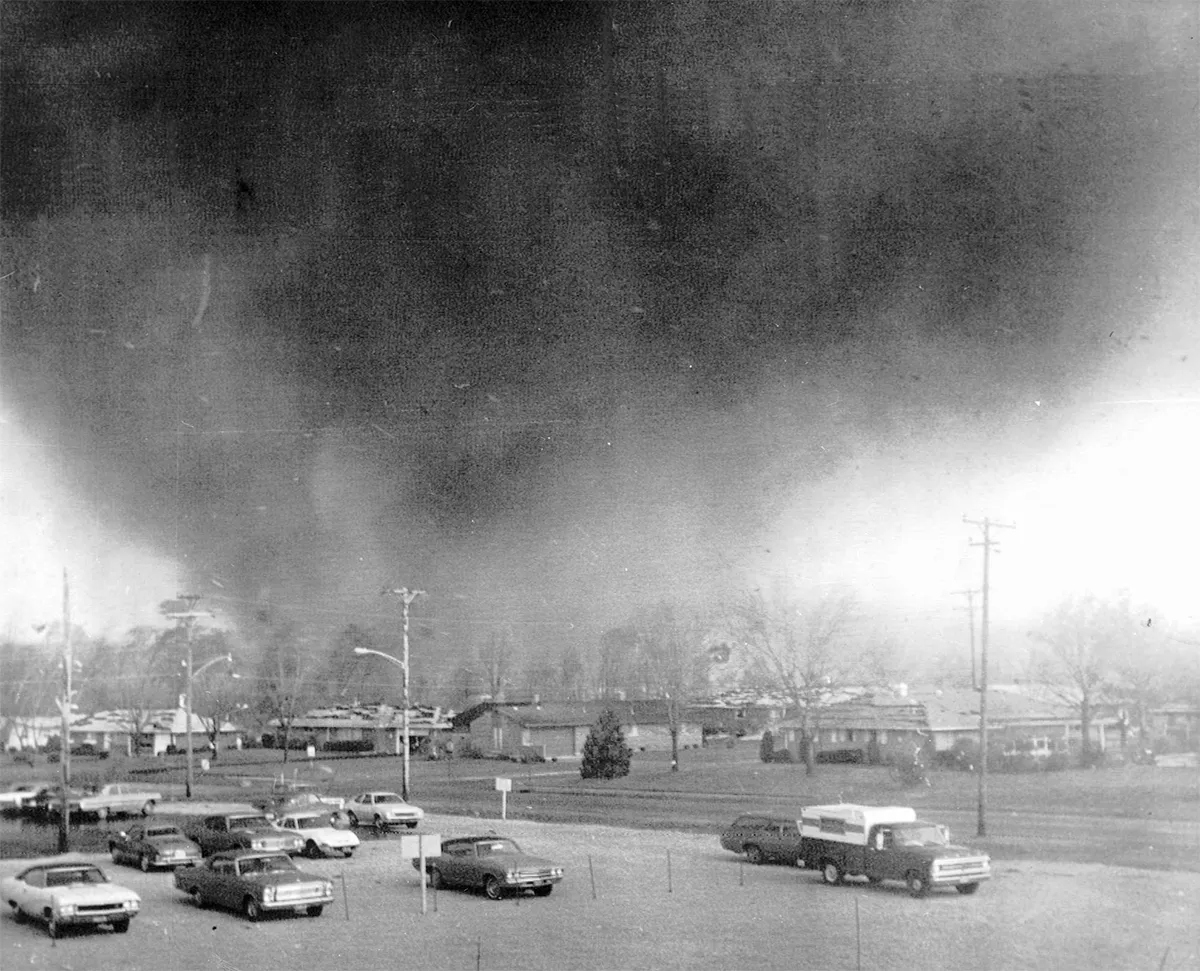
An F5 tornado in Xenia, Ohio, on April 3, 1974

=== 1970–1979 ===
- June 12, 1970 – A brief F0 tornado touched down in Ashland County, causing little damage.
- June 14, 1970 – A small F1 tornado destroyed a barn and a tool shed in Ross County, but no injuries were reported.
- February 22, 1971 – A relatively short-tracked F2 tornado moved through Fayette and Pickaway counties, destroying barns and heavily damaging crop fields. An intense F3 tornado touched down in Franklin County, moving through eastern Columbus and causing $2.8 million (1971 USD) in damages.
- April 3, 1974 – A violent F5 tornado hit Xenia, killing 34 people and injuring an estimated 1,150 people. Much of Xenia was completely destroyed, and the tornado was estimated to have caused $250 million (1974 USD) in damages. An F2 tornado hit London, destroying a grain silo before lifting. Another F5 tornado initially touched down in Ohio County in Indiana, before tracking into Kentucky and then crossing state lines into Hamilton County. Three people were killed, and multiple homes were destroyed. An F4 tornado moved through Cincinnati, destroying various structures in the northern portion of the city and killing 2 people. An F2 tornado hit Lebanon, destroying multiple mobile homes but causing no injuries. Another F2 tornado hit New Albany, damaging 20 homes and destroying 3 barns. An F1 tornado moved through Circleville, causing little damage. An F2 tornado in Continental damaged multiple mobile homes, and 2 barns were destroyed. An F3 tornado killed one person near West Union and injured four others. An F1 tornado tracked through Brown and Adams counties, causing minor damage to rural outbuildings and crops. An F3 tornado hit Paulding, destroying 5 mobile homes but injuring nobody. An F1 tornado that briefly impacted Melrose destroyed a mobile home, and another F1 tornado directly south of Paulding caused minor damage. An F1 tornado in Aberdeen caused minor damage to crops but was unconfirmed and may have been a brief downburst.
- April 1, 1974 – A brief F0 tornado touched down in Greenville, causing minor damage to a television antenna.
  | FU | F0 | F1 | F2 | F3 | F4 | F5 |
  |---|---|---|---|---|---|---|
  | 1+ | 5+ | 8 | 12 | 2 | 2 | 1 |

=== 1980–1989 ===
- June 2, 1980 – An F1 tornado in Hamilton County damaged houses, and injured 15 people. Another F2 tornado impacted areas near Oak Hill and Patriot, damaging 2 homes and destroying 7 barns.
- May 31, 1985 – An F4 tornado downed trees and power lines in Ashtabula County before moving into Erie County in Pennsylvania. The tornado would go on to kill 12 people in Cranesville, Pennsylvania. A strong F3 tornado damaged over 40 homes in Bundysburg, and several vehicles were heavily damaged. Another strong and violent F4 tornado hit Trumbull County, downing trees at F0 and F1 intensity before rapidly intensifying on the Ohio-Pennsylvania border. The tornado would go on to kill 18 people in Pennsylvania and caused an estimated $5,000,000 (1985 USD) in damages. An F2 tornado hit Dorset, before crossing the state border into Pennsylvania. No injuries were reported, but the tornado destroyed several homes. A powerful F5 tornado passed through Trumbull County, hitting hard the cities of Niles and Hubbard before crossing into Pennsylvania and striking Wheatland and Hermitage. There were 12 lives lost in Ohio (9 of them in Niles) and 8 in PA, over 500 injured, and $140 million in property damage. It remains the easternmost recorded F5 in US history and the last F5 in Ohio to date. An F1 tornado touched down briefly near London, inflicting damage to crops and trees, while a strong F3 tornado tracked through Licking and Coshocton counties, killing one person and causing an estimated $5,000,000 (1985 USD) in damages to several homes and other structures. A long-tracked F2 tornado moved through Columbiana County, damaging farms, crops and uprooting several trees. A strong F1 tornado touched down in Frazeysburg, and tracked 11 miles, damaging trees, buildings and other structures in its path. 2 brief F1 tornadoes caused minor damage in Stark and Adams counties.
- March 10, 1986 – A brief but strong F2 tornado touched down near Maud, damaging multiple homes and other structures. An F1 tornado tracked through St. Henry, uprooting trees and inflicting minor damage to homes and other structures. An F2 tornado developed and touched down directly above Wilmington, causing intense damage to structures and injuring 10 people. A long-tracked F2 tornado impacted Sabina, causing damage to houses and businesses. Power lines were downed and crop fields were destroyed before the tornado lifted. In total, 10 people were injured. An F1 tornado tracked through areas around Wyandot, damaging outbuildings and other rural structures. A relatively short-lived F2 tornado damaged Ripley and the outskirts of Russellville, and a strong F2 tornado killed one person in Huron County and damaged multiple homes. Another strong F2 tornado hit Norwich, killing one person who was sheltering in a poorly built home and injuring 3 others. The tornado damaged multiple structures and uprooted trees.

=== 1990–1999 ===
- November 22, 1992 – An F3 tornado tracked through Preble and Darke counties, destroying an estimated 30 buildings and injuring 21 people. A brief F1 tornado also touched down near Eastwood, damaging 10 outbuildings and flipping a small mobile home.

| FU | F0 | F1 | F2 | F3 | F4 | F5 |
|---|---|---|---|---|---|---|
| 0 | 0 | 0 | 1 | 0 | 2 | 0 |

=== 2000–2009 ===
- September 20, 2000 – An F4 tornado hit Xenia, killing one person and injuring 100 more.
- November 10, 2002 – An extremely powerful and violent F4 tornado hit the communities of Van Wert and Roselms, killing 4 people and injuring 17 others. The tornado destroyed multiple homes and businesses, and uprooted trees.
- April 28, 2002 – A strong F2 tornado touched down in Crystal Springs, destroying 300 houses and damaging a middle school. The tornado downed over 1,000 trees, but no injuries were reported.

| EFU | EF0 | EF1 | EF2 | EF3 | EF4 | EF5 |
|---|---|---|---|---|---|---|
| 1 | 1 | 2 | 1 | 0 | 1 | 0 |

=== 2010–2019 ===
- June 5, 2010 – A brief EF0 tornado touched down in Richland County, destroying a barn and causing minor damage to crops. An EF1 tornado tracked through Holmes and Tuscarawas counties, damaging 20 structures and uprooting trees. An EF2 tornado impacted areas around Liberty Center, damaging houses and downing power lines. An EF1 tornado was documented near Whitehouse, and it inflicted roof damage to multiple houses before lifting. A violent EF4 tornado tracked through Wood and Ottawa counties, destroying up to 60 houses and damaging hundreds of other structures. Lake High School was destroyed, and 7 people were killed. The tornado was estimated to have caused $102.4 million (2010 USD) in damages.
- May 27, 2019 – 182 tornadoes touched down across six days, including at least 22 in Ohio. The most powerful tornado was one that struck the city of Dayton and the surrounding area at EF4 intensity, injuring 166 people, with one elderly woman dying of her injuries received during the storm. The Dayton tornado touched down west of Brookville, travelled in a relatively straight east-southeastern line for a little over 18 miles, and is thought to have dissipated near Burkhardt road in the Old North End of Dayton. Aside from the Dayton tornado, numerous weaker EF0-EF2 tornadoes formed during the outbreak, with one tornado in particular striking to the north of the town of Celina, injuring eight and killing one. The Celina tornado was rated EF3, and managed to lift a house off its foundation and drop it in a field 70 yards away, leaving the house "relatively undamaged".

| EFU | EF0 | EF1 | EF2 | EF3 | EF4 | EF5 |
|---|---|---|---|---|---|---|
| 4 | 3+ | 10+ | 5+ | 2 | 2 | 0 |

=== 2020–present ===
- January 11, 2020 – An EF0 tornado touched down in Troy, Ohio, damaging trees and roofs. Several businesses lost their roofs, and the tornado rapidly weakened as it left Troy. A second EF0 also touched down southwest of Fletcher, Ohio. The tornado damaged barn roofs, snapped tree branches, and damaged electrical poles.
- September 4, 2022 – An EF0 tornado briefly touched down in Boardman, causing damage to a strip mall.
- February 27, 2023 – An EF1 tornado touched down northwest of Middletown, Ohio. The tornado damaged roofs, snapped trees, leveled a barn, and tore the roof off of a home. An EF0 tornado then touched down in Convoy, Ohio, picking up an unanchored chicken coop, pushing out the metal roofing of a shed, and pushing in the side of the shed. A second EF1 was produced north of New Carlisle, Ohio, uprooting trees, damaging roofs, and destroying a barn. An EF0 tornado was produced near Orient, Ohio, causing minor damage. The tornado lifted the garage roof off of a property, and ripped roof panels off of other properties. The tornado dissipated as it entered Orient. A second EF0 touched down near Etna, Ohio, causing localized damage. The tornado snapped and uprooted trees.
- June 15, 2023 – A lone supercell formed over southern Michigan along a cold front, moved over the western end of Lake Erie, and produced an EF2 tornado in the Point Place neighborhood of Toledo, Ohio. The tornado uprooted trees, destroyed the upper floor of a medical office, and lifted after crossing the Maumee River. The supercell then produced a second EF2 in Oak Harbor, which destroyed five residential buildings. The supercell continued in a southeastern direction, producing several weak EF0-EF1 tornadoes and another EF2 in Huron County that, according to a resident's account to the NWS, had "strong southerly inflow into the storm" that caused minor damage before the arrival of the tornado itself. The tornado destroyed an outbuilding, a barn, and several houses. The final tornado from the storm touched down in Ashland County, causing EF0 damage to an outbuilding, a chicken coop, and a garage door. The supercell was responsible for a total of twelve tornadoes, breaking the record for the largest outbreak in northwest Ohio.
- August 24–25, 2023 – Strong thunderstorms developed along a cold front. The system would later organize into a fast-moving cluster of thunderstorms, producing several EF0–EF1 tornadoes, including one in Cleveland, before producing an EF2 tornado in Warrensville and Bedford Heights, Ohio. The tornado downed and uprooted trees, damaged the roofs of a car dealership and industrial park, and caused significant damage to 2 industrial buildings with brick walls. The storm would drop 3 more EF1 tornadoes before producing the second EF2 in Middlefield, Ohio. The tornado caused minor damage to trees and completely destroyed and lofted a barn. The barn was thrown 150 yards away, with the entire outside structure collapsing. Nearby barns were also damaged. The storm would later produce 1 more EF0 before stopping. The system would produce 12 tornadoes in Ohio in total, and the tornado on the east side of Cleveland was the first tornado to occur within city limits since July 12, 1992.
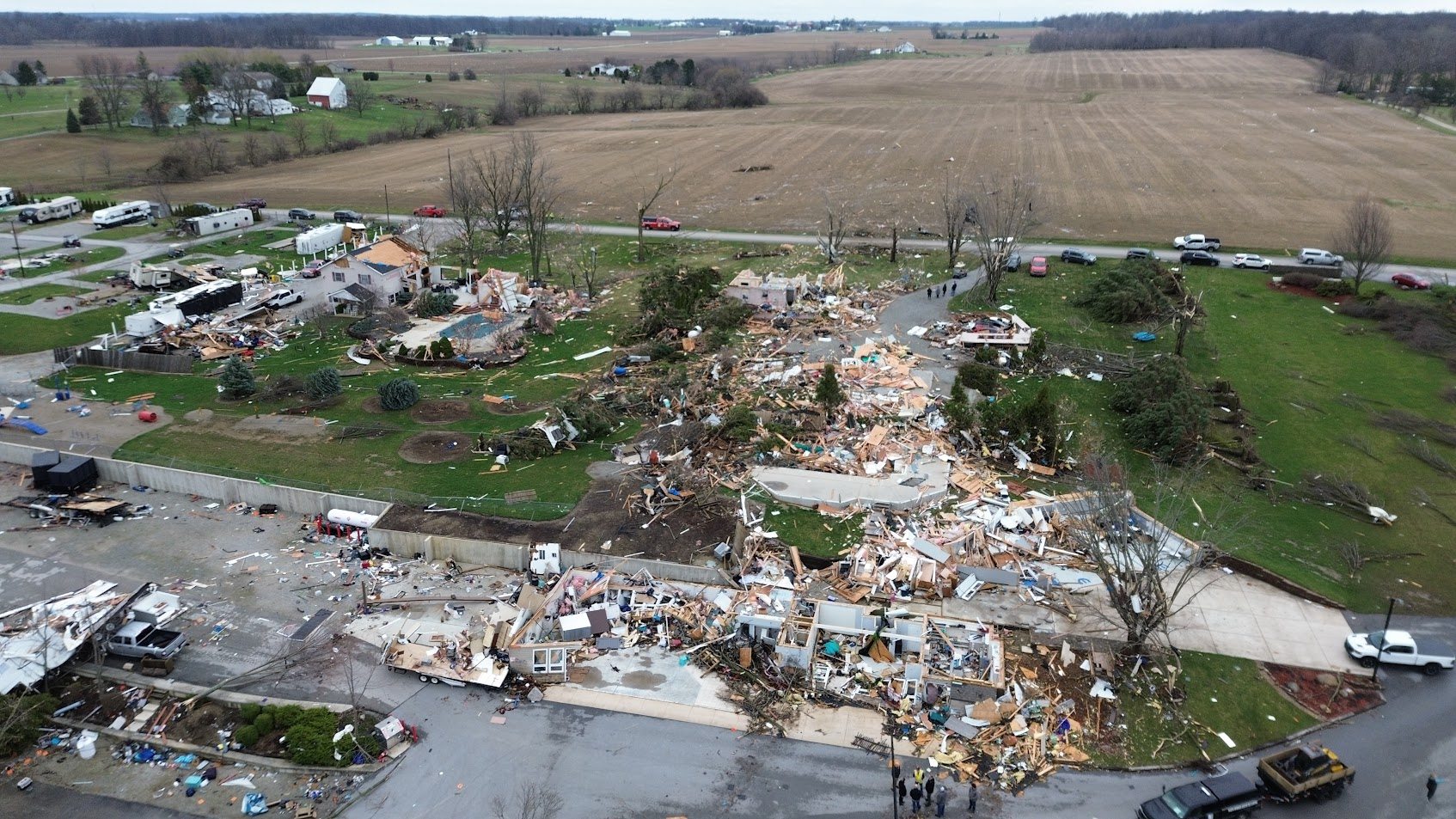
  EF3 damage in Fryburg on March 15, 2024
  March 14, 2024 – An EF3 tornado hit the Lakeview area, killing 3 people and injuring 27 others. A strong EF1 tornado touched down near Wapakoneta, moving through Auglaize County but injuring nobody. An EFU tornado briefly touched down near Vanlue, causing no damage. An EF3 tornado that initially touched down in Indiana moved into Darke and Miami counties, killing one person and injuring 39 others. An EF2 tornado also damaged structures in Shiloh. A strong EF2 tornado damaged several homes in Broadway, and an EF1 tornado Delaware and Licking counties damaged schools and homes and also destroyed farm equipment.
- April 2, 2024 – A strong EF1 tornado crossed state lines from Kentucky into Lawrence County, damaging houses and other buildings while downing power lines. One person was injured, and the tornado was originally classified as a downburst. 2 more EF1 tornadoes touched down in Lawrence County, both of which uprooted trees and damaged small structures. A brief but strong EF1 tornado damaged trees directly north of Pea Ridge, West Virginia, and an EF1 tornado uprooted multiple large hardwood trees outside of Crown City. An EF1 tornado tracked through areas near Manchester, causing extreme damage to large trees and power lines. An EF0 tornado touched down briefly in Gratiot before lifting, causing minimal damage. A relatively weak EF1 tornado touched down briefly near Zanesville, destroying a shed and various other small structures. A brief but strong EF2 tornado hit Jackson, damaging a house and uprooting multiple trees. An EF0 and EF1 tornado touched down in Muskingum County, both causing little damage, A brief EF1 tornado also tracked through New Concord, and multiple trees were snapped or uprooted.

== Sources ==
- National Weather Service (April 1968). Storm Data Publication (Report). National Centers for Environmental Information – via Storm Events Database.
- National Weather Service (February 1971). Storm Data Publication (Report). National Centers for Environmental Information – via Storm Events Database.
