= Spring Creek (Brush Creek tributary) =

Stream in Nebraska, U.S.

Spring Creek Tributary to Brush Creek
- Location of Spring Creek mouth Spring Creek (Brush Creek tributary) (the United States)

Location
- Country: United States
- State: Nebraska
- County: Holt

Physical characteristics
- Source: Turkey Creek divide
  - location: about 1 mile southeast of School No. 147
  - coordinates: 42°41′53.01″N 098°50′1.33″W
  - elevation: 2,030 ft (620 m)
- Mouth: Brush Creek
  - location: about 3 miles west of School No. 12
  - coordinates: 42°49′5.00″N 098°49′28.32″W
  - elevation: 1,578 ft (481 m)
- Length: 10.52 mi (16.93 km)
- Basin size: 11.22 square miles (29.1 km^{2})
- Discharge
  - location: Brush Creek
  - average: 1.39 cu ft/s (0.039 m^{3}/s) at mouth with Niobrara River

Basin features
- Progression: Brush Creek → Niobrara River → Missouri River → Mississippi
- River system: Niobrara
- Bridges: 889th Road, 890th Road, 483rd Avenue, 891st Road, 892nd Road

Spring Creek is a 10.52 mi (16.93 km) long first-order tributary to Brush Creek in Holt County, Nebraska.

Spring Creek rises on the Turkey Creek divide about 1 mile (1.6 km) southeast of School No. 147 in Holt County and then flows generally north to join Brush Creek about 3 miles (4.8 km) west of School No. 12.

== Watershed ==
Spring Creek drains 11.22 square miles (29.1 km^{2}) of area, receives about 24.7 in/year (63 cm/year) of precipitation, and is about 2.63% forested.

== See also ==
- List of rivers of Nebraska
