= List of tornadoes in the outbreak sequence of May 14–31, 1962 =

A long-lived, destructive tornado outbreak sequence caused widespread impacts across the entire United States between May 14-31, 1962. 188 tornadoes were recorded during this timeframe and even more tornadoes occurred in the days following the outbreak sequence. It was part of a period between May 14 and June 25 where at least one tornado touched down every day.

== Confirmed tornadoes ==
Confirmed tornadoes by Fujita rating
FU	F0	F1	F2	F3	F4	F5	Total
0	60	65	43	15	4	0	188

=== May 14 event ===
List of confirmed tornadoes – Monday, May 14, 1962 (Note: All dates are based on the local time zone where the tornado touched down; however, all times are in Coordinated Universal Time and dates are split at midnight CST/CDT for consistency.) (Note: Prior to 1994, only the average widths of tornado paths were officially listed.) (Note: Prior to 1994, the damage costs of storms were listed by damage class. Values listed in Storm Data are the medians of those classes.)
F#	Location	County / Parish	State	Start coord.	Time (UTC)	Path length	Max. width	Summary
F1	Gardena	Los Angeles	CA	33.87°N 118.3°W	20:00–?	0.1 miles (0.16 km)	10 yards (9.1 m)	A small tornado touched down twice, demolishing two commercial buildings, partially unroofing an industrial plant, and causing minor damage to a nursery. There was $25,000 in damage.
F1	S of Dix (1st tornado)	Kimball	NE	41.22°N 103.48°W	22:00–?	0.1 miles (0.16 km)	10 yards (9.1 m)	Tornadoes were spotted in an open area before they rapidly dissipated, causing no damage.
F1	S of Dix (2nd tornado)	Kimball	NE	41.22°N 103.48°W	22:00–?	0.1 miles (0.16 km)	10 yards (9.1 m)	Tornadoes were spotted in an open area before they rapidly dissipated, causing no damage.
F1	Haigler	Dundy	NE	40.02°N 101.95°W	22:00–?	0.1 miles (0.16 km)	10 yards (9.1 m)	Several farmsites were destroyed, although no monetary damage value was given. The track was probably longer than what is officially documented.
F3	NW of Springview, NE to Burton, NE to Mills, NE to Bonesteel, SD	Keya Paha (NE), Boyd (NE), Gregory (SD)	NE, SD	42.88°N 99.92°W	23:00–?	53.8 miles (86.6 km)	1,760 yards (1,610 m)	See section on this tornado – Eight (possibly nine) people were injured and damage was estimated at $250,000. Grazulis classified the tornado as an F4.
F2	Hemingford to Chadron State Park	Box Butte, Dawes	NE	42.32°N 103.1°W	23:30–?	18.3 miles (29.5 km)	880 yards (800 m)	Large tornado skipped north-northeast at 20 miles per hour (32 km/h), destroying farm sites and power lines. Barns and other farm buildings were destroyed and a truck was thrown a considerable distance. Losses totaled $25,000.
F1	ENE of Geddes	Charles Mix	SD	43.28°N 98.57°W	00:00–?	0.1 miles (0.16 km)	10 yards (9.1 m)	One person was injured by this brief tornado, although no monetary damage value was given. This tornado may have been a continuation of the long-tracked Bonesteel F3 tornado.
F3	S of Corsica to Mitchell to Huron to E of Broadland	Douglas, Davison, Sanborn, Beadle	SD	43.4°N 98.38°W	00:30–?	70.4 miles (113.3 km)	1,760 yards (1,610 m)	See section on this tornado – Two people were injured.
F1	S of Hershey (1st tornado)	Lincoln	NE	41.07°N 101.03°W	00:30–?	0.1 miles (0.16 km)	10 yards (9.1 m)	First of four tornadoes that were on the ground moving eastward at around the same time along a southwest to northeast line. Some power lines, silos, irrigation systems, and barns were damaged or destroyed and some livestock was lost. No damage value was given. Grazulis classified the tornado as an F2.
F1	S of Hershey (2nd tornado)	Lincoln	NE	41.07°N 101.03°W	00:30–?	0.5 miles (0.80 km)	10 yards (9.1 m)	Second of four tornadoes that were on the ground moving eastward at around the same time along a southwest to northeast line. Some power lines and farm sites were damaged and some livestock was lost. No damage value was given.
F1	ENE of Gandy (1st tornado)	Logan	NE	41.48°N 100.43°W	00:30–?	0.1 miles (0.16 km)	10 yards (9.1 m)	Third of four tornadoes that were on the ground moving eastward at around the same time along a southwest to northeast line. Some power lines and farm sites were damaged and some livestock was lost. No damage value was given.
F1	ENE of Gandy (2nd tornado)	Logan	NE	41.48°N 100.43°W	00:30–?	0.1 miles (0.16 km)	10 yards (9.1 m)	Fourth of four tornadoes that were on the ground moving eastward at around the same time along a southwest to northeast line. Some power lines and farm sites were damaged and some livestock was lost. No damage value was given.

=== May 15 event ===
List of confirmed tornadoes – Tuesday, May 15, 1962
F#	Location	County / Parish	State	Start coord.	Time (UTC)	Path length	Max. width	Summary
F3	SSE of Gregory	Gregory	SD	43.2°N 99.4°W	21:00–?	0.1 miles (0.16 km)	10 yards (9.1 m)	No monetary damage value was given. Grazulis did not list the tornado as an F2 or stronger.
F2	Brownlee	Cherry	NE	41.48°N 100.43°W	23:00–?	0.1 miles (0.16 km)	10 yards (9.1 m)	A tornado was observed destroying all but the home of a ranch. There was $25,000 in damage. Grazulis did not list the tornado as an F2 or stronger.
F1	Wallace	Marlboro	SC	34.72°N 79.85°W	23:10–23:15	1 mile (1.6 km)	10 yards (9.1 m)	A "small yellowish funnel" struck a clothing factory, knocking down a brick wall. Two people were injured and losses totaled $25,000.
F2	Roswell	Miner	SD	44°N 97.7°W	00:30–?	4.1 miles (6.6 km)	10 yards (9.1 m)	Strong tornado moved north-northwestward through Roswell. The tornado destroyed a service station, several barns, a trailer, and a home. Two people were injured, but no damage value was given. Grazulis classified the tornado as a near-F4.

=== May 16 event ===
List of confirmed tornadoes – Wednesday, May 16, 1962
F#	Location	County / Parish	State	Start coord.	Time (UTC)	Path length	Max. width	Summary
F0	WSW of Ramon	Lincoln	NM	34.2°N 105°W	17:00–?	0.1 miles (0.16 km)	17 yards (16 m)	A passing motorists observed this tornado moving east-northeast over open country. There was no damage.
F0	S of Wheeler	Cheyenne	KS	39.57°N 101.7°W	21:00–?	0.1 miles (0.16 km)	10 yards (9.1 m)	A tornado touched down for a few minutes along the Sherman-Cheyenne County line near K-27. There was no damage.
F2	E of Carthage	Miner	SD	44.17°N 97.65°W	21:00–?	0.1 miles (0.16 km)	10 yards (9.1 m)	No monetary damage was given. The tornado may have been closer to Madison than Carthage. Grazulis did not list the tornado as an F2 or stronger.
F0	W of Melrose	Curry	NM	34.43°N 103.9°W	22:00–?	0.1 miles (0.16 km)	10 yards (9.1 m)	An unconfirmed tornado embedded within heavy rain and hail was later verified and put into the database. A 149 ft (45 m) transmitter tower was twisted counter-clockwise of its base, causing $2,500 in damage. Fruit trees and crops were also damaged by the accompanying hail and heavy rain.
F3	Bonesteel	Gregory	SD	43.07°N 98.95°W	22:00–?	0.1 miles (0.16 km)	33 yards (30 m)	Two people were injured, but no monetary damage value was given. Storm Data puts this tornado near Howard without listing any casualties. Grazulis did not list the tornado as an F2 or stronger.
F1	E of Hugoton	Stevens	KS	37.17°N 101.22°W	00:45–01:00	0.1 miles (0.16 km)	300 yards (270 m)	A tornado moving due north halfway between Hugoton and Woods tore down 10-15 utility poles. There was $250 in damage.
F1	S of De Smet	Kingsbury	SD	44.33°N 97.55°W	00:45–?	0.1 miles (0.16 km)	10 yards (9.1 m)	No monetary damage value was given.
F1	SW of South Shore	Grant	SD	45.08°N 96.97°W	00:45–?	1 mile (1.6 km)	10 yards (9.1 m)	No monetary damage value was given for this tornado.

=== May 17 event ===
List of confirmed tornadoes – Thursday, May 17, 1962
F#	Location	County / Parish	State	Start coord.	Time (UTC)	Path length	Max. width	Summary
F0	N of Boise City	Cimarron	OK	36.92°N 102.50°W	20:22–?	0.1 miles (0.16 km)	10 yards (9.1 m)	A cooperative weather observer reported a funnel 13 miles (21 km) north of Boise City that moved north-northeast. This tornado may have been the same one that hit Stonington, Colorado. Grazulis classified the tornado as an F2.
F2	Pecos	Reeves	TX	31.43°N 103.48°W	20:30–?	2 miles (3.2 km)	67 yards (61 m)	The first of two tornadoes to strike the Pecos area, this strong and destructive tornado touched down southeast of town before moving north-northeastward and striking areas on the east side. It first hit the brand new, 3-month-old Calvary Baptist Church, which had its steeple ripped off, parts of its roof blown off and caved in, and a wall crumble, causing an estimated $20,000 in damage. A 350-foot-tall (110 m) radio tower was blown over, a smoke stack at a Pecos Laundry was bent over, and an abandoned bottling plant partially collapsed. Several roofs were blown off, hundreds of windows were blown out, sheds were destroyed, signs were blown off, numerous power poles and lines were blown down, and numerous trees were down on the streets and on homes. Northeast of town, four to five buildings on a farm along the Balmorhea Highway were damaged, mostly due to the tornado tossing 8-by-16-inch (0.67 by 1.33 ft) cinder blocks through a cinder block wall while an additional block was blown through a car window. Three people were injured at this location. Losses totaled $250,000. The tornado, which came from one of four funnel clouds spotted near town with another tornado touching down south of town, was not immediately confirmed to have gone through the city and tornado researcher Thomas P. Grazulis did not list the event as an F2 or stronger. In addition to the tornado, 3–3.5-inch (7.6–8.9 cm) "snowball" hail smashed 256 windows at an elementary school while .75 inches (19 mm) of heavy rain fell in 15 minutes, flooding the streets.
F0	S of Pecos	Reeves	TX	31.23°N 103.35°W	20:30–?	0.5 miles (0.80 km)	17 yards (16 m)	Second of two tornadoes to strike the Pecos area. News reports indicated that a tornado was sighted 10 to 15 miles (16 to 24 km) from Pecos. There was no damage.
F1	NW of Sturgis, OK to Stonington	Baca	CO	37°N 102.2°W	21:30–?	0.5 miles (0.80 km)	17 yards (16 m)	Several farms were damaged in scattered areas of Baca County, including in the vicinity of Walsh. The tornado destroyed barns on three or more farms. Damages were estimated at $250. This tornado may have been a continuation to the earlier Boise City, Oklahoma tornado. Grazulis classified the tornado as an F2.
F0	W of Oberlin	Decatur	KS	39.83°N 100.72°W	22:30–?	0.1 miles (0.16 km)	10 yards (9.1 m)	Brief tornado moving northeast caused no damage, although attendant 70 miles per hour (110 km/h) winds did do some damage.
F1	S of Mt. Dora to NW of Clayton	Union	NM	36.42°N 103.45°W	22:30–?	15.3 miles (24.6 km)	10 yards (9.1 m)	This destructive tornado seriously damaged or obliterated numerous small buildings and corral fences. Many power and telephone lines were downed. On one farm, a house lost its roof, which was thrown 12 miles (19 km), and one of the rooms, which was lifted off its foundation. A piece of window glass was blown across the living room and through a closed door before embedding itself into the baseboard of an adjoining room. The home owner only received minor cuts from broken glass and was not listed as an injury. A chicken house and garage on the property was also destroyed while a well house was picked up and thrown on top of the car that was in the garage. Large trees were twisted off about 2 feet (0.61 m) above the ground. There was significant damage on other farms and ranches as well, including one that saw extensive damage along with its garage being picked up and destroyed. In Mt. Dora itself, the Colorado and Southern Railroad water tower and the frame building at the Depot were destroyed. Damage from this tornado totaled $25,000.
F0	Mt. Dora	Union	NM	36.52°N 103.5°W	22:30–?	0.1 miles (0.16 km)	10 yards (9.1 m)	This was probably a satellite tornado to the stronger F1 tornado listed above. Damage from this tornado totaled $250.
F0	E of Deer Lodge	Powell	MT	46.42°N 112.92°W	00:00–?	0.1 miles (0.16 km)	10 yards (9.1 m)	A Northwest Airlines pilot reported a tornado over open country 10 to 15 miles (16 to 24 km) east of Deer Lodge. No damage occurred.
F1	SE of Holdrege	Phelps	NE	40.43°N 99.33°W	00:30–?	0.1 miles (0.16 km)	10 yards (9.1 m)	Brief tornado moved northeast, causing no damage.
F2	NNW of Roy to E of Mills	Harding	NM	35.97°N 104.23°W	01:00–?	10.8 miles (17.4 km)	10 yards (9.1 m)	At least three different funnel clouds were observed in the area where this strong tornado, which was accompanied by hail and heavy rain, occurred. Numerous small farm buildings and barns were destroyed. One person was injured and losses totaled $25,000. The tornado occurred at an elevation of 6,000 feet (1,800 m).
F0	NE of Goodland (1st tornado)	Sherman	KS	39.48°N 101.52°W	01:35–?	0.1 miles (0.16 km)	10 yards (9.1 m)	Two tornadoes, one much larger than the other, touched down over open country, causing no damage.
F0	NE of Goodland (2nd tornado)	Sherman	KS	39.48°N 101.52°W	01:35–?	0.1 miles (0.16 km)	10 yards (9.1 m)	Two tornadoes, one much larger than the other, touched down over open country, causing no damage.
F0	E of McLean	Pierce	NE	42.38°N 97.45°W	03:20–?	0.1 miles (0.16 km)	10 yards (9.1 m)	Brief tornado moved north, causing no damage.
F2	Syracuse	Hamilton	KS	37.98°N 101.78°W	04:05–?	12.6 miles (20.3 km)	250 yards (230 m)	Intermittent but strong tornado touched down along the Arkansas River about 2 miles (3.2 km) west of Syracuse and moved northeast before dissipating 11 miles (18 km) north of town. Losses totaled $25,000. Grazulis did not list the tornado as an F2 or stronger.
F1	E of Utica	Yankton	SD	42.97°N 97.42°W	05:30–?	0.1 miles (0.16 km)	10 yards (9.1 m)	Buildings on several farms were damaged, with losses totaling $25,000.

=== May 18 event ===
List of confirmed tornadoes – Friday, May 18, 1962
F#	Location	County / Parish	State	Start coord.	Time (UTC)	Path length	Max. width	Summary
F2	W of Maywood to NNW of Moorefield	Frontier, Lincoln	NE	40.65°N 100.65°W	19:40–?	14.2 miles (22.9 km)	10 yards (9.1 m)	Strong tornado touched down 2 miles (3.2 km) west of Maywood and moved northeastward along the Medicine Creek valley. Barns were destroyed on four farmsteads and losses totaled $25,000. The tornado also moved a combine harvester 300 yd (270 m). Many people observed this tornado's progress from distant vantage points.
F0	Northern Hershey	Lincoln	NE	41.17°N 101.00°W	19:55–?	0.1 miles (0.16 km)	10 yards (9.1 m)	Brief tornado caused no damage.
F1	S of Ovid	Sedgwick	CO	40.93°N 102.38°W	20:00–?	0.1 miles (0.16 km)	10 yards (9.1 m)	Small tornado caused $250 in damage to farm buildings south of Ovid.
F1	Northeastern Paxton	Keith	NE	41.13°N 101.35°W	20:15–?	0.1 miles (0.16 km)	10 yards (9.1 m)	Tornado touched down just outside of Paxton and moved northeastward at 25 miles per hour (40 km/h). The tornado caused damage to four or five locations, with homes and barns unroofed or destroyed. Grazulis classified the tornado as an F2 with a 25-mile-long (40 km), skipping path and listed the date of occurrence as May 15.
F1	Jacksonville	Shelby	IA	41.6°N 95.47°W	20:30–?	3 miles (4.8 km)	50 yards (46 m)	Damaging tornado touched down west of Tennant and moved northwestward, striking Jacksonville before dissipating south of Portsmouth. There was $250,000 in damage.
F2	NE of Darfur to Grogan to S of Mapleton	Watonwan, Blue Earth	MN	44.07°N 94.8°W	21:00–?	42.4 miles (68.2 km)	50 yards (46 m)	Long-tracked, strong, skipping tornado, which may have been a tornado family, touched down halfway between Darfur and Sveadahl and moved east-southeastward to near Mapleton, where it was observed by two farmers. It then turned northeastward and dissipated 9 miles (14 km) later. Several farm outbuildings were damaged or destroyed, hundreds of trees were uprooted and twisted, and farm machinery was damaged by flying debris. There was $25,000 in damage. Grazulis did not list the tornado as an F2 or stronger.
F0	Brady	Lincoln	NE	41.03°N 100.37°W	21:41–?	0.1 miles (0.16 km)	10 yards (9.1 m)	Tornado touched down in an open area near the Platte River and drew up water from a nearby canal. There was no monetary damages. The tornado likely came from the same storm that produced the earlier Maywood tornado, but it is unclear if this was the same tornado as it was not observed for 20 miles (32 km).
F1	NW of Burwell	Garfield	NE	41.87°N 99.22°W	21:45–?	0.1 miles (0.16 km)	10 yards (9.1 m)	Tornado touched down just east of the Garfield-Loup County border and moved northeastward. There was no damage.
F1	N of Cold Spring	Stearns	MN	45.5°N 94.48°W	22:15–?	1.5 miles (2.4 km)	10 yards (9.1 m)	Small, but destructive tornado moved northwest and struck a farm, destroying two farm buildings. Three people were injured by flying debris and losses totaled $2,500. The funnel cloud from the dissipated tornado was later observed in Freeport, which is 18 miles (29 km) northwest of Cold Spring.
F1	N of Castana to SW of Mapleton	Monona	IA	42.1°N 95.9°W	23:00–?	1.9 miles (3.1 km)	200 yards (180 m)	Tornado caused $25,000 in damage.
F1	Rush City	Chisago	MN	45.68°N 92.98°W	23:45–?	2 miles (3.2 km)	150 yards (140 m)	Northward-moving tornado made a roaring sound according to an observer. Trees were twisted off, outbuildings were damaged or destroyed, and the sides of a basement house had its screens and windows popped open. Damage was estimated at $2,500.
F1	ENE of Imperial	Chase	NE	45.68°N 92.98°W	00:30–?	0.1 miles (0.16 km)	10 yards (9.1 m)	Brief tornado caused no damage. The tornado may have actually occurred at 18:30 UTC according to Storm Data.
F1	S of Fairmont	Riley	KS	39.08°N 96.53°W	03:10–?	0.1 miles (0.16 km)	10 yards (9.1 m)	Tornado caused considerable damage to an electric power structure along K-13 (present-day K-177) just north of US 40. Service was cut on a 115,000 volt line and a number of 50-gallon drums filled with sand were scattered throughout the area. Losses totaled $250.

=== May 19 event ===
List of confirmed tornadoes – Saturday, May 19, 1962
F#	Location	County / Parish	State	Start coord.	Time (UTC)	Path length	Max. width	Summary
F1	Midland	Klamath	OR	42.13°N 121.83°W	20:00–?	0.5 miles (0.80 km)	20 yards (18 m)	Small, but damaging tornado completely demolished a hay barn and caused some other slight damage to large objects that were thrown about. Damage was estimated at $2,500.
F2	W of Bond	Beaverhead	MT	45.30°N 112.70°W	23:00–?	2 miles (3.2 km)	17 yards (16 m)	Strong tornado hit a ranch yard northwest of Dillon, destroying a machine shed and damaging other buildings. Losses totaled $25,000. Grazulis did not list the tornado as an F2 or stronger.

=== May 20 event ===
List of confirmed tornadoes – Sunday, May 20, 1962
F#	Location	County / Parish	State	Start coord.	Time (UTC)	Path length	Max. width	Summary
F2	N of Bakersfield	Franklin	VT	44.8°N 72.8°W	17:00–?	1.8 miles (2.9 km)	100 yards (91 m)	First of three northeastward moving tornadoes from an eastward-moving cell. Low-end F2-level damage from the tornadoes included the destruction of a barn, silo, and brand-new trailer home, damage to several homes and other buildings, and many trees being broken or uprooted. Power and phone outages also occurred in some communities. Losses totaled $25,000.
F1	Westfield to Troy	Orleans	VT	44.9°N 72.4°W	17:30–?	1.8 miles (2.9 km)	100 yards (91 m)	Second of three northeastward moving tornadoes from an eastward-moving cell. Damage from the tornadoes included the destruction of a barn, silo, and brand-new trailer home, damage to several homes and other buildings, and many trees being broken or uprooted. Power and phone outages also occurred in some communities. Losses totaled $25,000.
F1	Albany to Coventry	Orleans	VT	44.9°N 72.4°W	17:45–18:00	9.4 miles (15.1 km)	100 yards (91 m)	Third of three northeastward moving tornadoes from an eastward-moving cell with this tornado touching down in Albany before lifting and touching down again in Coventry. Damage from the tornadoes included the destruction of a barn, silo, and brand-new trailer home, damage to several homes and other buildings, and many trees being broken or uprooted. Power and phone outages also occurred in some communities. Losses totaled $25,000 and one person was injured, although the injury was not reported by Storm Data.
F2	S of Vernon	Wilbarger	TX	33.98°N 99.27°W	21:00–?	1 mile (1.6 km)	50 yards (46 m)	Small, but strong tornado destroyed a small building and blew down several utility poles. No monetary damage value was given. Storm Data says the tornado occurred on May 19 rather than May 20. Grazulis did not list the tornado as an F2 or stronger.
F1	NNE of Matador	Motley	TX	34.05°N 100.8°W	21:30–?	1 mile (1.6 km)	33 yards (30 m)	Small tornado touched down twice north of Matador. It just missed a drive-in theater on its first touch down before it touched down again at a farm home just southeast of the East Mound Cemetery entrance. A trailer was destroyed, mesquite trees were twisted and uprooted and a few sheds were damaged. Despite the damage, no monetary damage value was given.
F2	Belvidere to S of Trousdale	Kiowa	KS	34.05°N 100.8°W	21:35–22:00	25.3 miles (40.7 km)	10 yards (9.1 m)	Two funnel clouds were spotted west of Belvidere before this strong tornado, which was embedded within a 2–3 mi (3.2–4.8 km) wide swath of 1 inch (2.5 cm) hail and strong winds, touched down south of town and moved almost due north, striking it before passing just barely east of Haviland. The storm caused extensive property damage and twisted and uprooted large trees, including some that fell on and broke power lines. Losses totaled $25,000. Grazulis did not list the tornado as an F2 or stronger.
F1	SSW of Hunter	Lincoln	KS	39.17°N 98.43°W	23:00–?	2 miles (3.2 km)	10 yards (9.1 m)	Tornado accompanied by golf-ball sized hail and strong winds damaged buildings on several farms. Losses totaled $2,500.
F2	N of Rushville (1st tornado)	Sheridan	NE	42.8°N 102.47°W	23:00–?	3.6 miles (5.8 km)	10 yards (9.1 m)	Strong, dusty tornado moved northeast, destroying a farmsite. Losses totaled $25,000. Grazulis did not list the tornado as an F2 or stronger.
F2	Cherokee	Alfalfa	OK	36.75°N 98.35°W	00:55–01:05	0.3 miles (0.48 km)	100 yards (91 m)	A strong, skipping tornado, which was embedded within a severe thunderstorm with heavy rain, was confirmed on the southwest side of Cherokee. Four blocks of TV antennas were broken, power poles were left leaning, and tree limbs were snapped, resulting in power outages. At one residence, a home had its brick facing torn off, while its pickup truck was moved next door. The worst damage was to the center section of a brand-new, two-story motel, which saw 16 of its 25 units damaged to the extent of $40,000. Overall losses from the tornado reached $250,000. The storm also produced 1.5 inches (38 mm) of rain in the town in less than 25 minutes. Grazulis did not list the tornado as an F2 or stronger.
F0	WNW of Frederick	Tillman	OK	34.42°N 99.08°W	01:36–?	0.1 miles (0.16 km)	10 yards (9.1 m)	Small tornado damaged a few farm outbuilding. No monetary damage value was given.
F0	NE of Faxon	Comanche	OK	34.5°N 98.53°W	02:10–?	0.1 miles (0.16 km)	10 yards (9.1 m)	Lawton radio station reported a tornado moving northeast. There was no damage.
F0	Marlow	Comanche	OK	34.65°N 97.97°W	05:11–?	0.1 miles (0.16 km)	10 yards (9.1 m)	Ham radio operator reported a tornado on the ground. There was no damage.

=== May 21 event ===
- Grazulis listed two unofficial F2 tornadoes on this date:
  - An F2 tornado destroyed barns on four farms near White Lake and Plankinton, South Dakota.
  - An F2 tornado destroyed barns and agricultural implements near Armour, South Dakota.

List of confirmed tornadoes – Monday, May 21, 1962
F#	Location	County / Parish	State	Start coord.	Time (UTC)	Path length	Max. width	Summary
F0	N of Rushville (2nd tornado)	Sheridan	NE	42.77°N 102.47°W	20:00–?	0.1 miles (0.16 km)	10 yards (9.1 m)	Tornado over open country caused no damage.
F0	NE of Ovid	Sedgwick	CO	40.98°N 102.35°W	21:00–?	0.1 miles (0.16 km)	10 yards (9.1 m)	Small tornado caused $250 in damage to farm buildings northeast of Ovid.
F3	NNW of Closter to Tilden to Hartington to NE of Wynot	Boone, Antelope, Madison, Pierce, Cedar	NE	41.9°N 97.9°W	00:50–02:00	71.1 miles (114.4 km)	500 yards (460 m)	See section on this tornado – Seven people were injured and losses totaled $10 million.
F3	Spencer, NE to SE of Fort Randall, SD	Holt (NE), Boyd (NE), Charles Mix (SD)	NE, SD	42.87°N 98.72°W	01:45–?	11 miles (18 km)	10 yards (9.1 m)	Tornado formed south of the Niobrara River and moved northeastward. 11 farmsteads were struck with damage ranging from minor to total destruction. Three of the farms lost every building on the property along with the house, including one that was completely leveled, with the tornado possibly reaching F4 intensity. The tornado promptly dissipated after crossing into South Dakota, where it obliterated the cabin of a "houseboat" and destroyed trailers, boats, and docks. Losses were estimated at $250,000. Grazulis classified the tornado as an F4, based on damage to a house near Spencer. This and the next event may have been part of a tornado family.
F1	E of Dallas to Gregory to N of Lake Andes	Gregory, Charles Mix	SD	43.23°N 99.48°W	02:00–?	47.9 miles (77.1 km)	10 yards (9.1 m)	Long-tracked, skipping tornado moved along an east-southeastward path, causing major damage in Gregory, Lake Andes, and rural areas in between. Near Gregory and Dallas, the tornado struck eight farms and tore a 300-yard-long (270 m) strip of pavement from SD 47. Two farmhouses were destroyed, one of which was made of brick and the other was a two-story structure. At least one entire farm was obliterated, including outbuildings, possibly at F4-level intensity. 45 homes were destroyed or damaged on the eastern shoreline of Lake Andes. Two people were injured and losses totaled $2.5 million. Grazulis listed this event as part of the preceding tornado, classified it as an F4, and reported F3-level damage near Gregory and Dallas.
F3	Mitchell	Davison	SD	43.72°N 98.05°W	02:00–?	1 mile (1.6 km)	167 yards (153 m)	See section on this tornado – A total of 32 people were injured and losses totaled $2.5 million.
F2	S of Woonsocket to E of Storla	Sanborn	SD	44.02°N 98.28°W	02:15–?	10.4 miles (16.7 km)	10 yards (9.1 m)	A strong tornado destroyed four barns, unroofed one house, and ripped a wall off another house, although no damage value was given.
F1	Hudson	Lincoln	SD	43.13°N 96.45°W	02:45–?	0.1 miles (0.16 km)	10 yards (9.1 m)	Brief tornado struck the town of Hudson, causing $25,000 in damage.
F1	Dell Rapids	Minnehaha	SD	43.83°N 96.72°W	03:00–?	0.1 miles (0.16 km)	10 yards (9.1 m)	Brief tornado struck the town of Dell Rapids, causing $25,000 in damage.

=== May 22 event ===
List of confirmed tornadoes – Tuesday, May 22, 1962
F#	Location	County / Parish	State	Start coord.	Time (UTC)	Path length	Max. width	Summary
F1	Steele Center to S of Owatonna	Steele	MN	43.97°N 93.23°W	23:30–?	8 miles (13 km)	10 yards (9.1 m)	Tornado moved northward, striking five farms in a row. Buildings, trees, and transmission lines were damaged, leaving behind $250,000 in losses. The tornado was not observed going through Owatonna, but extensive wind damage occurred in the town and 50 mph (80 km/h) winds were recorded at the municipal airport.
F0	NNW of Stewartville	Olmsted	MN	43.9°N 92.53°W	00:00–?	1 mile (1.6 km)	10 yards (9.1 m)	Cooperative spotter reported a northeastward-moving tornado that damaged a few trees. There was no property/monetary damages.
F2	N of Stewartville	Olmsted	MN	43.9°N 92.53°W	00:00–?	0.5 miles (0.80 km)	10 yards (9.1 m)	Four unanchored concrete beams weighing up to 12 tons were picked up from their supports at a highway construction job and destroyed. Losses totaled $25,000. Grazulis did not list the tornado as an F2 or stronger.
F2	Iowa City	Johnson	IA	41.65°N 91.53°W	02:00–?	4.1 miles (6.6 km)	800 yards (730 m)	1 death – See section on this tornado – Damage was estimated at $250,000. Grazulis did not list the tornado as an F2 or stronger.

=== May 23 event ===
List of confirmed tornadoes – Wednesday, May 23, 1962
F#	Location	County / Parish	State	Start coord.	Time (UTC)	Path length	Max. width	Summary
F1	Aurora	Portage	OH	41.3°N 81.4°W	18:30–?	0.1 miles (0.16 km)	30 yards (27 m)	A small but damaging tornado destroyed a barn and buildings at the Round Lake Park while also disrupting utility services. Other areas sustained damage, debris was left in a circular pattern, and losses totaled $250,000. The path length of this tornado was probably longer than what is officially documented.
F1	N of Mazie	Mayes	OK	36.12°N 95.37°W	04:20–?	0.3 miles (0.48 km)	67 yards (61 m)	Small, but damaging tornado touched down momentarily and struck two farms with the first one sustaining the most damage. That farm had its house and barn roofs partially blown off and all its windows blown out, two metal grain storage bins destroyed, and a combine moved from one side of the barnyard north to the other. One girl sustained minor injuries when the car she was in was hit by flying debris, smashing the windshield. At the other farmsite, the house lost its back porch along with windows and fences while damage to other buildings and grain bins was generally minor. Losses totaled $25,000.

=== May 24 event ===
List of confirmed tornadoes – Thursday, May 24, 1962
F#	Location	County / Parish	State	Start coord.	Time (UTC)	Path length	Max. width	Summary
F2	Brownsburg, PA to Hopewell Township, NJ to Port Mercer, NJ to S of Princeton, NJ	Bucks (PA), Mercer (NJ)	PA, NJ	40.32°N 74.95°W	19:30–?	16.6 miles (26.7 km)	300 yards (270 m)	Strong, destructive tornado embedded within a swath of golf-ball sized hail developed halfway between Buckmanville, Pennsylvania and Brownsburg and grew to 60–67 yards (55–61 m) wide as it moved generally eastward at F1 strength, uprooting 25 trees and lifting an eight-car maintenance building several inches of its foundation before setting it back down. The tornado then crossed the Delaware River in the joint Pennsylvania and New Jersey towns of Washington Crossing at the Washington Crossing State Park and grew to its maximum size and peak intensity as it skipped eastward, causing considerable damage. At Hopewell Township, a brand-new, unopened elementary school was completely unroofed. Many roofs and TV antennas and hundred of trees were uprooted or twisted off as the tornado passed through the township before passing south of Pennington, north of Lawrenceville, and through the north side of Port Mercer before the tornado dissipated south of Princeton. A truck was also overturned on a highway, injuring the driver, and losses from the tornado totaled $275,000.
F3	Hillcrest to Waterville to Wolcott to Southington	New Haven, Litchfield, Hartford	CT	41.55°N 73.12°W	21:30–22:00	11.6 miles (18.7 km)	120 yards (110 m)	1 death – See section on this tornado – Tornado caused "near-F4" damage north of Waterbury and in Southington. A total of 50 people were injured and losses total $5 million.
F2	Nickerson	Reno	KS	38.15°N 98.1°W	22:37–?	0.1 miles (0.16 km)	10 yards (9.1 m)	A destructive tornado struck Nickerson as part of a broader severe thunderstorm complex. Two people were injured, but no damage value was given. Grazulis did not list the tornado as an F2 or stronger.
F3	NNE of Abbyville	Reno	KS	38.05°N 98.18°W	23:00–?	0.1 miles (0.16 km)	10 yards (9.1 m)	An intense tornado damaged farmland, injuring two people and leaving behind $250 in losses. The tornado destroyed a bowling alley and unroofed a home between Nickerson and Hutchinson.
F1	NE of Partridge	Reno	KS	37.98°N 98.07°W	23:00–?	0.1 miles (0.16 km)	10 yards (9.1 m)	A tornado damaged farmland, injuring two people and leaving behind $250 in losses.
F2	N of Welon	Jackson	OK	34.68°N 99.37°W	23:15–?	0.1 miles (0.16 km)	10 yards (9.1 m)	A farmer spotted three funnel clouds that merged and touched down on his farm. Two chicken houses, a garage, a dwelling house, and a tractor were destroyed and the house on the property lost its front porch and part of its roof. The tornado then lifted briefly before touching down again and moving over SH-44 (present-day US 283 and SH-6). A truck and car that were traveling together were damaged by debris as well as baseball-sized hail they were trying to shelter from. The truck also had one of its doors blown off while the car was struck by a falling tree that they were trying to shelter under. Losses totaled $2,500. Grazulis did not list the tornado as an F2 or stronger.
F2	SSW of Altus	Jackson	OK	34.58°N 99.37°W	23:16–?	0.1 miles (0.16 km)	10 yards (9.1 m)	A strong tornado, which may have been spotted by the Oklahoma State Police as an eastward-moving funnel aloft, may have actually touched down closer to Duke, where a barn and other outbuildings were destroyed. There was $25,000 in damage.
F0	Olustee	Jackson	OK	34.55°N 99.43°W	23:25–?	0.1 miles (0.16 km)	10 yards (9.1 m)	First of two small tornadoes spotted by the Altus Department of Public Safety. There was no damage.
F0	N of Olustee	Jackson	OK	34.57°N 99.42°W	23:25–?	0.1 miles (0.16 km)	10 yards (9.1 m)	Second of two small tornadoes spotted by the Altus Department of Public Safety. There was no damage.
F0	SSW of Miller	Lyon	KS	38.58°N 96.03°W	00:15–?	0.1 miles (0.16 km)	10 yards (9.1 m)	A few farm buildings were damaged to the tune of $2,500.
F0	SW of Fort Sill	Comanche	OK	34.55°N 98.5°W	00:15–?	0.1 miles (0.16 km)	10 yards (9.1 m)	Three funnels were spotted with one of them touching down in an open field, causing no damage.
F3	Burrton to Halstead to Newton	Harvey	KS	38.03°N 97.67°W	00:30–01:05	18.8 miles (30.3 km)	10 yards (9.1 m)	Intense and destructive tornado moved northeastward toward Hesston, turned southward towards Halstead, reversed itself towards the northeast, and again changed directions to the southeast and striking Newton before dissipating. A few gas stations, two homes, and some trailers were destroyed or unroofed. Damage was estimated at $500,000.
F1	SSE of Hartman	Scotts Bluff	NE	41.87°N 103.98°W	01:30–?	0.1 miles (0.16 km)	10 yards (9.1 m)	Several funnel clouds were reported near Lyman and Stegall with one of them touching down, destroying a large feed building and damaging several vehicles. Losses totaled $25,000.
F0	NNE of Loveland (1st tornado)	Tillman	OK	34.32°N 98.75°W	01:32–01:35	0.1 miles (0.16 km)	10 yards (9.1 m)	First of two tornadoes spotted by a National Severe Storms Project Observer. It moved through an open field for three minutes before dissipating, causing no damage.
F0	NNE of Loveland (2nd tornado)	Tillman	OK	34.32°N 98.75°W	01:32–01:35	0.1 miles (0.16 km)	10 yards (9.1 m)	Second of two tornadoes spotted by a National Severe Storms Project Observer. It moved through an open field for three minutes before dissipating, causing no damage.
F0	Lyman	Uinta	WY	41.33°N 110.3°W	02:00–?	0.1 miles (0.16 km)	10 yards (9.1 m)	Eastward-moving tornado struck a farmstead, destroying a feed building and injuring a cow. Losses totaled $2,500.
F0	SW of Snyder	Kiowa	OK	34.62°N 99°W	05:13–?	0.1 miles (0.16 km)	10 yards (9.1 m)	A neighbor watched this tornado touch down on an adjacent farm, damaging only trees around the home while causing no property damage.

=== May 25 event ===
List of confirmed tornadoes – Friday, May 25, 1962
F#	Location	County / Parish	State	Start coord.	Time (UTC)	Path length	Max. width	Summary
F0	S of Foss	Washita	OK	35.42°N 99.17°W	22:05–?	0.1 miles (0.16 km)	10 yards (9.1 m)	Sayre Police Department reported a tornado that was apparently over open country. There was no further details or damage reported.
F0	ENE of Bessie	Washita	OK	35.43°N 98.88°W	00:25–?	0.1 miles (0.16 km)	10 yards (9.1 m)	A tornado was reported by the Oklahoma City Weather Bureau Airport, although no further details or damage was reported.
F4	Dill City	Washita	OK	35.27°N 99.2°W	00:28–00:45	7.2 miles (11.6 km)	250 yards (230 m)	See section on this tornado – Nine people were injured and losses totaled $250,000.
F3	Radium to Plainview	Jones	TX	32.83°N 100°W	00:50–?	4.1 miles (6.6 km)	67 yards (61 m)	1 death – Deadly tornado destroyed three homes 9 miles (14 km) northwest of Anson. One home and a barn was leveled with a woman being killed and her husband being critically injured when they were thrown 200 yards (180 m) from the property. Four other homes and two additional barns were destroyed along the path. The tornado also killed an undisclosed number of cattle and total losses reached $25,000.
F0	NE of Mankato to E of Webber	Jewell	KS	39.83°N 98.15°W	01:00–01:15	0.1 miles (0.16 km)	10 yards (9.1 m)	This rope tornado, which was accompanied by separate funnel clouds at four separate times, skipped very slowly northeastward (although it is officially recorded as a brief tornado), passing over the east end of the Lovewell Dam Lake. Five to six farm plants were damaged and a lot of water was sucked out of the lake. Losses totaled $2,500.
F1	N of Lone Wolf to W of Hobart	Kiowa	OK	35.03°N 99.23°W	01:00–?	6.8 miles (10.9 km)	10 yards (9.1 m)	Tornado moved eastward, unroofing a barn before dissipating just before entering the west side of Hobart. Damage was estimated at $25,000. Although the tornado did not strike Hobart, accompanying straight-line winds of up to 86 miles per hour (138 km/h) destroyed some wheat, damaged the city's west side waterworks pump station, and downed a 1/2 mile (0.80 km) of phone lines.
F0	WSW of Corinth	Jones	TX	32.85°N 99.9°W	01:00–?	0.1 miles (0.16 km)	10 yards (9.1 m)	A brief tornado touchdown occurred on the east shore of the Anson North Lake. There was no damage.
F1	S of Avoca	Jones	TX	32.82°N 99.73°W	01:00–?	1 mile (1.6 km)	33 yards (30 m)	Weak tornado caused no monetary damages.
F3	Southeastern Weatherford	Custer	OK	35.52°N 98.72°W	01:19–01:34	1.5 miles (2.4 km)	10 yards (9.1 m)	This intense tornado first touched down on a farm just south of Weatherford, where a cotton gin was destroyed and several other farm buildings were damaged. It skipped northeastward into the southeastern part of town, where a portion of metal roof was ripped off a building and thrown over an adjacent home before smashing into another one across the street, injuring four people. A joint building containing an antique shop and liquor store also lost its roof, which was tossed into a motel. The tornado then continued northeastward at rooftop level, causing minor damage to signs, garages, roofs, porches, and trees on the east side of town before dissipating. Losses totaled $250,000. Heavy rain also accompanied the tornado, although it caused no additional damage.

=== May 26 event ===
List of confirmed tornadoes – Saturday, May 26, 1962
F#	Location	County / Parish	State	Start coord.	Time (UTC)	Path length	Max. width	Summary
F0	WSW of Dale	Pottawatomie	OK	35.37°N 97.1°W	06:40–07:02	0.1 miles (0.16 km)	10 yards (9.1 m)	A funnel cloud briefly touched down over open country before lifting and remaining aloft as it passed over Dale. There was no damage.
F0	WSW of Tribbey	Pottawatomie	OK	35.37°N 97.1°W	06:50–07:02	0.1 miles (0.16 km)	10 yards (9.1 m)	A brief tornado, which caused no damage, was mostly observed as a funnel cloud aloft.
F2	W of Salisbury	Sangamon	IL	39.88°N 89.85°W	11:30–?	0.1 miles (0.16 km)	10 yards (9.1 m)	Brief but strong tornado struck a farm, damaging the house's roof, farm buildings and a truck. Losses totaled $2,500. The funnel cloud of the tornado was spotted by the neighbor of the farm where the family heard the roar of the tornado. Grazulis did not list the tornado as an F2 or stronger.
F2	WNW of Banta	Morgan	IN	39.53°N 86.27°W	15:30–?	0.1 miles (0.16 km)	10 yards (9.1 m)	Brief but strong tornado accompanied by heavy rain damaged or destroyed several buildings, including barns, on a farm south of Waverly Woods and Waverly. Losses totaled $25,000.
F2	Vauces	Ross	OH	39.3°N 82.9°W	20:00–?	0.1 miles (0.16 km)	10 yards (9.1 m)	Brief but strong tornado struck at the intersection US 50 and US 35 southeast of Chillicothe with the worst damage at the Y Drive Inn, two restaurants, and a service station. Losses totaled $25,000. Grazulis did not list the tornado as an F2 or stronger.
F0	E of Uniontown	Union	KY	37.78°N 87.9°W	21:25–?	0.1 miles (0.16 km)	10 yards (9.1 m)	A pilot spotted a tornado picking up dust or debris. There was no property damage.
F0	SW of Rahm	Vanderburgh	IN	37.83°N 87.67°W	22:07–?	0.1 miles (0.16 km)	10 yards (9.1 m)	A tornado was reported west of Henderson, Kentucky along the Ohio River 14 miles (23 km) southwest of Evansville while 1/2 inch (1.3 cm) hail fell 3 miles (4.8 km) north of the Evansville Airport. No damage occurred from either event.
F0	W of Blair	Jackson	OK	34.78°N 99.32°W	23:02–?	0.1 miles (0.16 km)	10 yards (9.1 m)	Oklahoma Highway Patrol reported a tornado that crossed a highway and dissipated, causing no damage.
F0	Old Retrop	Washita	OK	35.22°N 99.18°W	23:45–?	0.1 miles (0.16 km)	10 yards (9.1 m)	Tornado reported within a storm cell west of Sentinel, although no other details were given and no damage occurred.
F0	SSE of Reed	Greer	OK	34.87°N 99.68°W	00:00–?	0.1 miles (0.16 km)	10 yards (9.1 m)	Oklahoma Highway Patrol reported that a tornado touched down well west of Mangum and crossed SH-9 before dissipating, causing no damage.
F1	N of Emporia	Lyon	KS	38.47°N 96.17°W	01:15–?	0.1 miles (0.16 km)	10 yards (9.1 m)	Tornado caused damage 4 miles (6.4 km) north of Emporia. Losses totaled $2,500.
F2	SW of Admire to S of Bushong	Lyon	KS	38.57°N 96.18°W	01:25–?	0.1 miles (0.16 km)	10 yards (9.1 m)	Tornado damaged four farms while moving in an odd northwestward direction. Losses totaled $2,500. The storm also produced a funnel cloud that was spotted 10–12 miles (16–19 km) northeast of Emporia. Grazulis did not list the tornado as an F2 or stronger.
F3	W of Pauline to NW of Terra Heights	Shawnee	KS	38.97°N 95.7°W	01:48–?	2 miles (3.2 km)	10 yards (9.1 m)	Intense tornado moved northwest and then northeast through the southwestern suburbs of Topeka. One home was blown apart and others were twisted as well. Four people sustained minor injuries and losses totaled $250,000. At least seven other funnel clouds were also spotted with this storm.
F4	S of Randlett to E of Cookietown	Cotton	OK	34.15°N 98.45°W	02:00–?	10.1 miles (16.3 km)	400 yards (370 m)	See section on this tornado – One person was injured and damages were estimated at $250,000.
F4	Haskell (1st tornado)	Haskell	TX	33.17°N 99.77°W	02:50–?	10.7 miles (17.2 km)	133 yards (122 m)	See section on this tornado – One person was injured and losses totaled $2.5 million.
F1	Haskell (2nd tornado)	Haskell	TX	33.17°N 99.77°W	02:50–?	1.5 miles (2.4 km)	50 yards (46 m)	See section on this tornado
F2	Haskell (3rd tornado)	Haskell	TX	33.17°N 99.77°W	02:50–?	1 mile (1.6 km)	67 yards (61 m)	See section on this tornado
F2	Atkins Hill to E of Norman	McClain, Cleveland	OK	35.17°N 97.45°W	02:58–?	6.8 miles (10.9 km)	100 yards (91 m)	This strong tornado developed a mile northeast of Goldsby near the Atkins Hill community and moved northeastward across Oklahoma State Highway 74, turning a car, boat, and trailer completely around while flipping the boat trailer, destroying two barns, including a dairy barn, and a garage, and downing power lines. The tornado then went aloft before touching down again twice and moving due east for 5 miles (8.0 km), flattening a whole line of power poles, breaking lines, and throwing other debris before dissipating. Losses totaled $25,000. Lightning from the storm also set a house on fire in Washington and winds of 71 miles per hour (114 km/h) and hail of 1.25 inches (3.2 cm) were recorded in Oklahoma City. Trees and roofs were also damaged by winds in Norman and Purcell.
F1	NE of Rotan to S of Aspermont	Stonewall	TX	32.97°N 100.3°W	03:00–?	9.1 miles (14.6 km)	133 yards (122 m)	This tornado, which was accompanied by baseball-sized hail, was produced by a funnel cloud that moved along the Brazos River for about 40 minutes. It ripped up trees on a farm, but caused no property damage.
F1	Appleton City	St. Clair	MO	38.2°N 94.03°W	04:30–?	0.2 miles (0.32 km)	17 yards (16 m)	The funnel cloud of this tornado was observed approaching Appleton City before it touched down. Several homes, trees, and cars were damaged, including one home where pieces of a broken window was sucked outward through the screen. A city marshal also reported a roaring sound as the storm approached the city as well. Losses totaled $25,000.

=== May 27 event ===
List of confirmed tornadoes – Sunday, May 27, 1962
F#	Location	County / Parish	State	Start coord.	Time (UTC)	Path length	Max. width	Summary
F2	SW of Leavenworth	Leavenworth	KS	39.23°N 95°W	21:45–?	0.1 miles (0.16 km)	10 yards (9.1 m)	A tornado damaged two farm houses west of Lansing. Losses totaled $2,500. A number of other areas in northeast Kansas were supposedly damaged by tornadic winds as well. Grazulis did not list the tornado as an F2 or stronger.
F0	ENE of Hoyt	Morgan	CO	40.02°N 104.05°W	22:00–?	0.1 miles (0.16 km)	10 yards (9.1 m)	This was the first in a series of three small tornadoes that damaged farm structures and caused $30 in losses each.
F0	NW of Hoyt	Morgan	CO	40.02°N 104.08°W	22:00–?	0.1 miles (0.16 km)	10 yards (9.1 m)	This was the second in a series of three small tornadoes that damaged farm structures and caused $30 in losses each.
F0	S of Hoyt	Adams	CO	39.98°N 104.07°W	22:00–?	0.1 miles (0.16 km)	10 yards (9.1 m)	This was the third in a series of three small tornadoes that damaged farm structures and caused $30 in losses each.
F1	E of Spearman	Hansford, Ochiltree	TX	36.17°N 101.08°W	22:30–?	4.5 miles (7.2 km)	50 yards (46 m)	This tornado damaged a house and destroyed a trailer. No damage estimate was given.
F2	N of Booker	Lipscomb	TX	36.48°N 100.53°W	22:30–?	0.1 miles (0.16 km)	10 yards (9.1 m)	A strong tornado destroyed a home, although no monetary damage value was given.
F0	S of Booker	Lipscomb	TX	36.43°N 100.53°W	22:30–?	0.1 miles (0.16 km)	10 yards (9.1 m)	Brief tornado caused no damage.
F0	W of Beaver	Beaver	OK	36.82°N 100.72°W	23:30–?	0.1 miles (0.16 km)	10 yards (9.1 m)	Storm watchers observed this brief tornado moving northeastward between two farm houses causing no damage.
F3	S of Perryton (1st tornado)	Ochiltree	TX	36.18°N 100.88°W	23:30–?	4.5 miles (7.2 km)	200 yards (180 m)	This was the first in a family of two or three tornadoes that moved northeastward, striking 13 farmhouses and destroying six of them along a 16-mile-long (26 km) path. A total of 13 people were injured, including four people that were injured in a car that was picked up and thrown off a road. Losses totaled $2.5 million.
F2	S of Perryton (2nd tornado)	Ochiltree	TX	36.18°N 100.88°W	23:30–?	1 mile (1.6 km)	83 yards (76 m)	This was the second in a family of three tornadoes that moved northeastward, destroying six homes along a 16-mile-long (26 km) path. No monetary damage value was given.
F1	S of Perryton (3rd tornado)	Ochiltree	TX	36.18°N 100.88°W	23:30–?	1.5 miles (2.4 km)	50 yards (46 m)	This was the third in a family of three tornadoes that moved northeastward, destroying six homes along a 16-mile-long (26 km) path. No monetary damage value was given.
F0	NW of Winona	Thomas	KS	39.15°N 101.37°W	00:10–?	0.1 miles (0.16 km)	10 yards (9.1 m)	A brief tornado touched down about 13 miles (21 km) south of Brewster, causing a minor $30 in damage.
F1	NW of Morganville to ESE of Clifton	Clay	KS	39.5°N 97.3°W	02:30–?	4.5 miles (7.2 km)	50 yards (46 m)	Weak tornado remained over open farmland, impacting no structures and causing only $2,500 in damage. The parent thunderstorm also caused some wind damage to the adjacent counties of Cloud, Washington, and Marshall.
F1	W of Cuba	Republic	KS	39.82°N 97.47°W	02:59–?	0.1 miles (0.16 km)	10 yards (9.1 m)	Short-lived tornado touched down 3/4 mi (1.2 km) west of Cuba and damaged buildings on two farms. Losses totaled $2,500.

=== May 28 event ===
List of confirmed tornadoes – Monday, May 28, 1962
F#	Location	County / Parish	State	Start coord.	Time (UTC)	Path length	Max. width	Summary
F0	NW of Midwest	Natrona	WY	43.45°N 106.33°W	17:30–?	0.1 miles (0.16 km)	10 yards (9.1 m)	A pilot reported a funnel cloud touching down about 40 miles (64 km) north of Casper. No damage was occurred.
F1	S of Swink	Otero	CO	37.98°N 103.62°W	20:00–?	0.1 miles (0.16 km)	10 yards (9.1 m)	A small tornado struck a farm on the south side of Swink west of La Junta, damaging a garage and house with losses totaling $250.
F0	N of Pleasantdale	Campbell	WY	44.13°N 105.72°W	20:27–?	0.1 miles (0.16 km)	10 yards (9.1 m)	A funnel cloud briefly touched down about 15 miles (24 km) southwest of Gillette, causing no damage.
F2	S of Fredericksburg	Gillespie	TX	30.28°N 98.85°W	21:00–?	5.1 miles (8.2 km)	100 yards (91 m)	A strong tornado struck a ranch while moving over open country in the Bear Creek area south of Fredericksburg, ripping huge, live oak trees out of the ground and piling them in heaps. No monetary damage value was given. There is the possibility that this was same tornado that occurred below. Grazulis did not list the tornado as an F2 or stronger.
F1	Comfort	Kendall	TX	30.28°N 98.85°W	21:00–?	4.3 miles (6.9 km)	27 yards (25 m)	This tornado caused extensive damage to trees and some farm structures in the Cypress Creek area of Kendall County. No monetary damage value was given. There is the possibility that this was same tornado that occurred above.
F1	W of Herndon	Rawlins	KS	39.92°N 100.92°W	21:30–?	1 mile (1.6 km)	10 yards (9.1 m)	Weak tornado damaged a farm building, dissipating as it approached another one. Losses totaled $2,500.
F1	N of Bird City	Cheyenne	KS	39.95°N 101.53°W	21:30–?	0.5 miles (0.80 km)	10 yards (9.1 m)	Tornado accompanied by light to moderate hail caused $2,500 in damage.
F2	W of Ingersoll	Alfalfa	OK	36.8°N 98.42°W	21:45–?	0.1 miles (0.16 km)	10 yards (9.1 m)	A small, brief, but strong tornado was observed on by State Highway Troopers on US 64. A big truck had its front end lifted up, causing it to blown into a ditch with the combine it was hauling being dumped out as well. A metal grain bin was also thrown into a small barn, damaging both. However, no damage estimate was given. Grazulis did not list the tornado as an F2 or stronger.
F2	SE of Emporia	Lyon	KS	38.33°N 96.12°W	22:00–?	3.6 miles (5.8 km)	300 yards (270 m)	A tornado accompanied by 1 inch (2.5 cm) hail damaged several farm buildings. Losses totaled $250,000. Grazulis did not list the tornado as an F2 or stronger.
F1	NE of Bird City to W of McDonald	Cheyenne	KS	39.78°N 101.48°W	22:30–?	0.1 miles (0.16 km)	10 yards (9.1 m)	A brief tornado touched down and traveled northeast. No monetary damage was reported.
F1	SE of Culbertson	Hitchcock	NE	40.2°N 100.8°W	22:30–?	0.1 miles (0.16 km)	10 yards (9.1 m)	Several buildings were destroyed at a farm site. Losses totaled $25,000.
F2	NNE of Pawnee Rock	Barton	KS	38.3°N 98.97°W	22:30–?	1.5 miles (2.4 km)	10 yards (9.1 m)	Two farm plants were damaged 10 miles (16 km) northeast of Larned, with a home and barns torn apart. Losses totaled $2,500.
F2	NE of Harveyville to Auburn	Osage, Shawnee	KS	38.83°N 95.9°W	22:40–?	0.9 miles (1.4 km) (Note: The archived description and start and end points indicate a 9-mile-long (14 km) path, but digital databases list a path length of 0.9 miles.)	200 yards (180 m)	This strong tornado, which was produced by the same storm that produced the Lyon County tornado and was part of a trail of wind, hail, and tornado damage, moved directly through Auburn, causing $250,000 in damage. Grazulis did not list the tornado as an F2 or stronger.
F0	NE of Nekoma	Henry	IL	41.18°N 90.17°W	23:12–?	0.1 miles (0.16 km)	10 yards (9.1 m)	A funnel cloud briefly touched down in an open field 8 miles (13 km) east of Woodhull. No damage was reported.
F1	N of Rock Creek	Jefferson	KS	39.3°N 95.53°W	23:20–?	0.1 miles (0.16 km)	10 yards (9.1 m)	A small tornado damaged buildings. Losses totaled $2.5 million, although some of it may have come from the longer swath of straight-line wind damage that accompanied the tornado.
F1	N of Shawnee	Pottawatomie	OK	35.4°N 96.92°W	23:20–?	0.1 miles (0.16 km)	10 yards (9.1 m)	A tornado briefly touched down, destroying a dairy barn and some chicken houses. Losses totaled $30. Damaging thunderstorm winds and another funnel cloud were also reported in and near Shawnee.
F2	E of Woodhull	Henry	IL	41.22°N 90.33°W	00:10–?	0.1 miles (0.16 km)	10 yards (9.1 m)	Listed as a brief tornado touchdown in open field with no damage being done. Grazulis did not list the tornado as an F2 or stronger.
F0	Galva	Henry	IL	40.95°N 89.62°W	00:30–?	0.1 miles (0.16 km)	10 yards (9.1 m)	A funnel cloud touched down at the intersection of US 34 and IL 17 and moved northeast. No significant damage was reported.
F1	SSE of Smithville	Clay	MO	39.35°N 94.58°W	01:00–?	2.3 miles (3.7 km)	50 yards (46 m)	This tornado touched down 1 mile (1.6 km) south of the Route 92 and Route 29 (present-day US 169) intersection and moved east-northeastward. Damages totaled $25,000.
F2	S of Genseo	Henry	IL	41.42°N 90.15°W	01:45–?	0.1 miles (0.16 km)	10 yards (9.1 m)	This strong tornado destroyed farm buildings while damaging homes, barns, and machinery on three farms. Trees and power lines were damaged and downed. Damage totaled $250,000.
F2	W of Columbia to Gosport to SE of Knoxville	Marion	IA	41.17°N 93.2°W	03:00–?	11.7 miles (18.8 km)	200 yards (180 m)	All buildings but the house were destroyed on one farm. Damage totaled $250,000.
F2	SE of Gilman	Marshall	IA	41.87°N 92.78°W	03:00–?	0.1 miles (0.16 km)	200 yards (180 m)	A strong tornado hit the southeast side of Gilman, injuring five people and causing $250,000 in damage. Grazulis did not list the tornado as an F2 or stronger.
F0	SE of Asher	Pottawatomie	OK	34.97°N 96.9°W	03:40–?	0.1 miles (0.16 km)	33 yards (30 m)	A tornado was spotted over open country by a pilot flying at 37,000 feet (11,000 m). No damage was reported.
F0	E of Kerrville	Kerr	TX	30.05°N 99.05°W	05:00–?	0.1 miles (0.16 km)	10 yards (9.1 m)	This tornado touched down over open country and caused only minor damage with no monetary value, although thunderstorm winds that accompanied the tornado blew down barns and trees and damaged crops.
F2	Albion to Talihina to Lamberson	Pushmataha, Latimer, Le Flore	OK	34.65°N 95.1°W	05:50–06:10	9.3 miles (15.0 km)	200 yards (180 m)	The tornado tore the roofs off three school buildings and damaged a fourth in Albion. Some windows at the school and a nearby house were blown out. The tornado subsequently skipped northeastward, destroying or damaging a total of 12 barns, houses, and other structures. Trees were splintered and power lines were downed, causing many power outages. Damage totaled $25,000.

=== May 29 event ===
List of confirmed tornadoes – Tuesday, May 29, 1962
F#	Location	County / Parish	State	Start coord.	Time (UTC)	Path length	Max. width	Summary
F2	Milburn	Johnston	OK	34.25°N 96.55°W	10:05–?	0.1 miles (0.16 km)	10 yards (9.1 m)	A brief, but strong tornado struck a farm, damaging the roof of the house while blowing out the attic windows. The sides of a garage were buckles out and the roof of the structure was lifted up and set back down. Nearby tree tops were twisted off and a light plane and truck were heavily damaged. Losses totaled $25,000. A farm family was awakened by the hissing sound from this tornado as well as the trembling of their home. Grazulis did not list the tornado as an F2 or stronger.
F1	Coal Valley area	Rock Island	IL	41.43°N 90.47°W	11:20–?	0.1 miles (0.16 km)	10 yards (9.1 m)	This weak tornado was spotted as a funnel cloud on the north edge of Coal Valley by an observer before he took cover in his basement. There was mainly tree and roof damage with losses totaling $2,500.
F0	N of Glenwood	Buffalo	NE	40.78°N 99.08°W	16:15–?	0.1 miles (0.16 km)	10 yards (9.1 m)	Tornado occurred over country north of Glenwood Park, causing no damage.
F0	SE of Ansley	Custer	NE	41.28°N 99.37°W	16:15–?	0.1 miles (0.16 km)	10 yards (9.1 m)	Tornado occurred over country, causing no damage.
F4	W of Dorsey to Eastern Bristow to NW of Gross	Holt, Boyd	NE	42.68°N 98.45°W	17:40–?	24.2 miles (38.9 km)	300 yards (270 m)	No damage information is available, although Storm Data lists the event as numerous funnel clouds observed in multiple counties with three brief tornado touchdowns over open country that caused no damage. Grazulis did not list the tornado as an F2 or stronger.
F1	ENE of Fairview	Columbia	FL	30.4°N 82.6°W	21:00–?	0.1 miles (0.16 km)	10 yards (9.1 m)	A tornado touched down briefly in the O'Leno State Park; no monetary damage value was given.
F1	Blodgett	Scott	MO	37.0°N 89.53°W	21:30–?	0.2 miles (0.32 km)	17 yards (16 m)	This tornado, which was produced by the same storm that tore the roof of a warehouse in Sikeston, touched down just east of Blodgett, damaging farm buildings. Losses totaled $25,000 and two people was injured, although Storm Data on list the injury of one child.
F1	Sumner	Bremer	IA	42.85°N 92.1°W	21:30–?	0.1 miles (0.16 km)	10 yards (9.1 m)	This tornado touched down and moved directly through Sumner, causing $25,000 in damage.

=== May 30 event ===
List of confirmed tornadoes – Wednesday, May 30, 1962
F#	Location	County / Parish	State	Start coord.	Time (UTC)	Path length	Max. width	Summary
F0	SW of Newkirk/Hardy	Kay	OK	36.87°N 97.08°W	22:30–?	0.1 miles (0.16 km)	10 yards (9.1 m)	Newkirk police reported the brief touch down of a small tornado, which caused no damage.

=== May 31 event ===
List of confirmed tornadoes – Thursday, May 31, 1962
F#	Location	County / Parish	State	Start coord.	Time (UTC)	Path length	Max. width	Summary
F0	Wallops Island	Accomack	VA	37.85°N 75.5°W	16:45–?	0.1 miles (0.16 km)	10 yards (9.1 m)	A pilot in flight reported a small tornado that was picking up trees. Loses totaled $250.
F2	Mercier to NE of Powhattan	Brown	KS	39.7°N 95.6°W	17:45–?	6.9 miles (11.1 km)	13 yards (12 m)	Narrow, but strong tornado moved northward, destroying an abandoned farm house in Mercier. Losses totaled $250. Grazulis did not list the tornado as an F2 or stronger.
F1	N of Wathena, KS to E of Nodaway, MO	Doniphan (KS), Holt (MO), Andrew (MO)	KS, MO	39.9°N 94.97°W	19:30–19:45	0.1 miles (0.16 km)	10 yards (9.1 m)	This narrow tornado crossed the Missouri River, avoiding buildings, but throwing dust and debris up 1/4 mile (0.40 km) into the air. Losses totaled $30.
F0	NNW of Nodaway	Holt	MO	39.95°N 95°W	19:45–?	0.1 miles (0.16 km)	10 yards (9.1 m)	Brief tornado caused $30 in damage.
F0	ESE of Richville	Andrew	MO	39.97°N 94.98°W	19:45–?	0.1 miles (0.16 km)	10 yards (9.1 m)	Brief tornado caused $30 in damage.
F1	N of Powhattan	Brown	KS	39.8°N 95.63°W	19:45–?	0.1 miles (0.16 km)	10 yards (9.1 m)	Short-lived tornado caused no damage.
F1	NW of Everest	Brown	KS	39.68°N 95.43°W	19:45–?	0.1 miles (0.16 km)	10 yards (9.1 m)	Short-lived tornado caused no damage.
F0	NNE of Burdett (1st tornado)	Pawnee	KS	38.2°N 99.52°W	22:00–?	0.1 miles (0.16 km)	10 yards (9.1 m)	First of two brief tornado to touch down in an open field, causing no damage.
F0	NNE of Burdett (2nd tornado)	Pawnee	KS	38.2°N 99.52°W	22:00–?	0.1 miles (0.16 km)	10 yards (9.1 m)	Second of two brief tornado to touch down in an open field, causing no damage.
F1	SW of Swearingen	Cottle	TX	34.12°N 100.2°W	02:10–?	2 miles (3.2 km)	33 yards (30 m)	A tornado was observed by the Cottle County Sheriff 8–10 miles (13–16 km) northeast of Paducah. No monetary damage occurred.
F0	S of Best	Reagan	TX	31.18°N 101.62°W	03:10–?	0.1 miles (0.16 km)	10 yards (9.1 m)	This tornado remained over country, causing no damage.
F3	Denton Valley	Callahan	TX	32.3°N 99.55°W	04:00–?	2 miles (3.2 km)	33 yards (30 m)	An intense, nighttime tornado demolished four homes near Denton 15 miles (24 km) southeast of Abilene. A man was critically injured when his light (1,600-pound (730 kg)) foreign car was hurled about 400 yards (370 m) off a highway and into a plowed, water-soaked field without touching the ground. Another man sustained severe head lacerations when the home he and five other people were in collapsed. Despite the destruction it caused, however, no monetary damage value was given for this tornado.
F2	NW of Longworth	Fisher	TX	32.67°N 100.37°W	04:30–?	1 mile (1.6 km)	20 yards (18 m)	Narrow, short-lived but strong tornado destroyed a porch and damaged a roof of a home 6 miles (9.7 km) south of Roby, although no monetary damage value was given. Accompanying golf ball sized hail that was 1.5 inches (3.8 cm) deep in some places also caused severe damage to homes, vehicles, and trees in nearby Rotan as well as ripening wheat in the area. Grazulis did not list the tornado as an F2 or stronger.

== See also ==
- List of North American tornadoes and tornado outbreaks
- List of tornadoes in the tornado outbreak sequence of May 2019
