= West Branch Louse Creek =

Stream in Nebraska, U.S.

West Branch Louse Creek Tributary to Louse Creek
- Location of West Branch Louse Creek mouth West Branch Louse Creek (the United States)

Location
- Country: United States
- State: Nebraska
- County: Holt

Physical characteristics
- Source: North Branch Vedigre Creek divide
  - location: about 2 miles northwest of Opportunity, Nebraska
  - coordinates: 42°36′22.00″N 098°27′17.30″W
  - elevation: 1,915 ft (584 m)
- Mouth: Louse Creek
  - location: about 4 miles west of Dorsey, Nebraska
  - coordinates: 42°40′43.00″N 098°26′18.29″W
  - elevation: 1,706 ft (520 m)
- Length: 6.31 mi (10.15 km)
- Basin size: 10.14 square miles (26.3 km^{2})
- Discharge
  - location: Louse Creek
  - average: 1.26 cu ft/s (0.036 m^{3}/s) at mouth with Louse Creek

Basin features
- Progression: Louse Creek → Niobrara River → Missouri River → Mississippi River → Gulf of Mexico
- River system: Niobrara
- Bridges: 502nd Avenue, 503rd Avenue

West Branch Louse Creek is a 6.31 mi (10.15 km) long second-order tributary to Louse Creek in Holt County, Nebraska. The confluence of this creek with East Branch Louse Creek forms Louse Creek.

== Course ==
West Branch Louse Creek rises on the North Branch Verdigre Creek divide about 2 miles (3.2 km) northwest of Opportunity, Nebraska in Holt County and then flows northeast to join East Branch Louse Creek forming Louse Creek about 4 miles (6.4 km) west of Dorsey, Nebraska.

== Watershed ==
West Branch Louse Creek drains 10.14 square miles (26.3 km^{2}) of area, receives about 25.1 in/year (64 cm/year) of precipitation, and is about 0.07% forested.

== See also ==
- List of rivers of Nebraska
