= Spring Creek (Redbird Creek tributary) =

Stream in Nebraska, U.S.

Spring Creek Tributary to Redbird Creek
- Location of Spring Creek mouth Spring Creek (Redbird Creek tributary) (the United States)

Location
- Country: United States
- State: Nebraska
- County: Holt

Physical characteristics
- Source: Elkhorn River divide
  - location: about 6 miles southwest of Redbird, Nebraska
  - coordinates: 42°41′10.01″N 098°32′28.30″W
  - elevation: 1,950 ft (590 m)
- Mouth: Redbird Creek
  - location: about 0.5 miles south of Opportunity, Nebraska
  - coordinates: 42°35′5.01″N 098°30′18.30″W
  - elevation: 1,654 ft (504 m)
- Length: 10.01 mi (16.11 km)
- Basin size: 14.69 square miles (38.0 km^{2})
- Discharge
  - location: Redbird Creek
  - average: 1.78 cu ft/s (0.050 m^{3}/s) at mouth with Redbird Creek

Basin features
- Progression: Redbird Creek → Niobrara River → Missouri River → Mississippi
- River system: Niobrara
- Bridges: 881st Road, 882nd Road, 884th Road, 498th Avenue, 887th Road

Spring Creek is a 10.01 mi (16.11 km) long first-order tributary to Redbird Creek in Holt County, Nebraska.

Spring Creek rises on the Elkhorn River divide about 0.5 miles (0.80 km) south of Opportunity, Nebraska in Holt County and then flows north-northwest to join Redbird Creek about 6 miles (9.7 km) southwest of Redbird, Nebraska.

== Watershed ==
Spring Creek drains 14.69 square miles (38.0 km^{2}) of area, receives about 25.0 in/year (64 cm/year) of precipitation, and is about 0.48% forested.

== See also ==
- List of rivers of Nebraska
