= Steel Creek (Niobrara River tributary) =

Stream in Nebraska, USA

Steel Creek Tributary to Niobrara River
- Location of Steel Creek mouth Steel Creek (Niobrara River tributary) (the United States)

Location
- Country: United States
- State: Nebraska
- County: Knox; Holt

Physical characteristics
- Source: North Branch Verdigre Creek divide
  - location: about 2 miles northwest of Star, Nebraska
  - coordinates: 42°37′27.00″N 098°23′30.29″W
  - elevation: 1,900 ft (580 m)
- Mouth: Niobrara River
  - location: about 5 miles east of Redbird, Nebraska
  - coordinates: 42°45′15.00″N 098°16′12.28″W
  - elevation: 1,346 ft (410 m)
- Length: 15.90 mi (25.59 km)
- Basin size: 24.09 square miles (62.4 km^{2})
- Discharge
  - location: Niobrara River
  - average: 2.81 cu ft/s (0.080 m^{3}/s) at mouth with Niobrara River

Basin features
- Progression: Niobrara River → Missouri River → Mississippi River → Gulf of Mexico
- River system: Niobrara
- Tributaries
  - right: Long Gulch
- Waterbodies: Revel Ponds
- Bridges: 883rd Road, 508th Avenue, 887th Road, 888th Road, 891 Road

Steel Creek is a 15.90 mi (25.59 km) long tributary of the Niobrara River in Knox County, Nebraska.

== Course ==
Steel Creek rises on the North Branch Verdigre Creek divide about 2 miles northwest of Star, Nebraska in Holt County and then flows northeast into Knox County to join the Niobrara River about 5 miles east of Redbird, Nebraska.

== Watershed ==
Steel Creek drains 24.09 square miles (62.4 km^{2}) of area, receives about 25.00 in/year of precipitation, has a wetness index of 448.54, and is about 10.86% forested.

== See also ==
- List of rivers of Nebraska
