= North Branch Eagle Creek (Middle Branch Eagle Creek tributary) =

Stream in Nebraska, U.S.

North Branch Eagle Creek Tributary to Middle Branch Eagle Creek
- Location of North Branch Eagle Creek mouth North Branch Eagle Creek (Middle Branch Eagle Creek tributary) (the United States)

Location
- Country: United States
- State: Nebraska
- County: Holt

Physical characteristics
- Source: Middle Branch Eagle Creek divide
  - location: about 1 mile east-northeast of School No. 102
  - coordinates: 42°37′50.01″N 098°53′35.34″W
  - elevation: 2,058 ft (627 m)
- Mouth: Middle Branch Eagle Creek
  - location: about 2 miles south of School No. 33
  - coordinates: 42°38′2.01″N 098°46′33.32″W
  - elevation: 1,788 ft (545 m)
- Length: 7.20 mi (11.59 km)
- Basin size: 17.56 square miles (45.5 km^{2})
- Discharge
  - location: Middle Branch Eagle Creek
  - average: 2.12 cu ft/s (0.060 m^{3}/s) at mouth with Middle Branch Eagle Creek

Basin features
- Progression: Middle Branch Eagle Creek → Eagle Creek → Niobrara River → Missouri River → Mississippi
- River system: Niobrara
- Bridges: 481st Avenue, 482nd Avenue, Lumber Road

North Branch Eagle Creek is a 7.20 mi (11.59 km) long first-order tributary to Middle Branch Eagle Creek in Holt County, Nebraska.

== Course ==
North Branch Eagle Creek rises on the Middle Branch Eagle Creek divide 1 mile (1.6 km) east-northeast of School No. 102 in Holt County and then flows east to join Middle Branch Eagle Creek forming about 2 miles (3.2 km) south of School No. 33.

== Watershed ==
North Branch Eagle Creek drains 17.56 square miles (45.5 km^{2}) of area, receives about 24.7 in/year (63 cm/year) of precipitation, and is about 0.72% forested.

== See also ==
- List of rivers of Nebraska
