= Oak Creek (Eagle Creek tributary) =

Stream in Nebraska, U.S.

Oak Creek Tributary to Eagle Creek
- Location of Oak Creek mouth Oak Creek (Eagle Creek tributary) (the United States)

Location
- Country: United States
- State: Nebraska
- County: Holt

Physical characteristics
- Source: Turkey Creek divide
  - location: about 4 miles southeast of School No. 147
  - coordinates: 42°41′25.01″N 098°48′3.33″W
  - elevation: 2,000 ft (610 m)
- Mouth: Eagle Creek
  - location: about 5 miles west-southwest of Midway, Nebraska
  - coordinates: 42°41′8.01″N 098°44′33.32″W
  - elevation: 1,703 ft (519 m)
- Length: 3.86 mi (6.21 km)
- Basin size: 2.70 square miles (7.0 km^{2})
- Discharge
  - location: Eagle Creek
  - average: 0.37 cu ft/s (0.010 m^{3}/s) at mouth with Eagle Creek

Basin features
- Progression: Eagle Creek → Niobrara River → Missouri River → Mississippi
- River system: Niobrara
- Bridges: 486th Avenue

Oak Creek is a 3.86 mi (6.21 km) long first-order tributary to Eagle Creek in Holt County, Nebraska.

== Course ==
Oak Creek rises on the Turkey Creek divide 4 miles (6.4 km) southeast of School No. 147 in Holt County and then flows east to join Eagle Creek about 5 miles (8.0 km) west-southwest of Midway, Nebraska.

== Watershed ==
Oak Creek drains 2.70 square miles (7.0 km^{2}) of area, receives about 24.7 in/year (63 cm/year) of precipitation, and is about 23.81% forested.

== See also ==
- List of rivers of Nebraska
