= Redbird Creek (Niobrara River tributary) =

Stream in Nebraska, U.S.

Redbird Creek Tributary to Niobrara River
- Location of Redbird Creek mouth Redbird Creek (Niobrara River tributary) (the United States)

Location
- Country: United States
- State: Nebraska
- County: Holt

Physical characteristics
- Source: Elkhorn River divide
  - location: about 4 miles north-northwest of O'Neill, Nebraska
  - coordinates: 42°30′32.01″N 098°40′27.32″W
  - elevation: 2,015 ft (614 m)
- Mouth: Niobrara River
  - location: about 0.5 miles northwest of Redbird, Nebraska
  - coordinates: 42°46′3.00″N 098°27′5.30″W
  - elevation: 1,404 ft (428 m)
- Length: 38.60 mi (62.12 km)
- Basin size: 157.51 square miles (407.9 km^{2})
- Discharge
  - location: Niobrara River
  - average: 41.59 cu ft/s (1.178 m^{3}/s) at mouth with Niobrara River

Basin features
- Progression: Niobrara River → Missouri River → Mississippi
- River system: Niobrara
- Tributaries
  - left: Blackbird Creek
  - right: Spring Creek
- Bridges: US 281, 493rd Avenue, 875th Road, 494th Avenue, 875th Road, 495th Avenue, 878th Road, 879th Road, 880th Road, 881st Road, 884th Road, 887th Road, 501st Avenue, 502nd Avenue, 503rd Avenue

Redbird Creek is a 38.60 mi (62.12 km) long third-order tributary to the Niobrara River in Holt County, Nebraska.

== Course ==
Redbird Creek rises on the Elkhorn River divide about 4 miles (6.4 km) north-northwest of O'Neill, Nebraska in Holt County and then flows generally northeast to join the Niobrara River about 0.5 miles (0.80 km) northwest of Redbird, Nebraska.

== Watershed ==
Redbird Creek drains 157.51 square miles (407.9 km^{2}) of area, receives about 24.7 in/year (63 cm/year) of precipitation, and is about 1.78% forested.

== See also ==
- List of rivers of Nebraska
