= Brush Creek (Niobrara River tributary) =

Stream in Nebraska, U.S.

Brush Creek Tributary to Niobrara River
- Location of Brush Creek mouth Brush Creek (Niobrara River tributary) (the United States)

Location
- Country: United States
- State: Nebraska
- County: Holt

Physical characteristics
- Source: North Branch Eagle Creek divide
  - location: about 3 miles northeast of School No. 89
  - coordinates: 42°39′38.61″N 098°54′46.34″W
  - elevation: 2,051 ft (625 m)
- Mouth: Niobrara River
  - location: about 2 miles northwest of School No. 12
  - coordinates: 42°49′35.00″N 098°49′0.32″W
  - elevation: 1,562 ft (476 m)
- Length: 19.52 mi (31.41 km)
- Basin size: 80.99 square miles (209.8 km^{2})
- Discharge
  - location: Niobrara River
  - average: 8.74 cu ft/s (0.247 m^{3}/s) at mouth with Niobrara River

Basin features
- Progression: Niobrara River → Missouri River → Mississippi
- River system: Niobrara
- Tributaries
  - right: Spring Creek
- Bridges: 887th Road, 479th Avenue, NE 11

Brush Creek is a 19.52 mi (31.41 km) long second-order tributary to the Niobrara River in Holt County, Nebraska.

== Course ==
Brush Creek rises on the North Branch Eagle Creek divide about 3 miles (4.8 km) northeast of School No. 89 in Holt County and then flows generally north-northeast to join the Niobrara River about 2 miles (3.2 km) northwest of School No. 12.

== Watershed ==
Brush Creek drains 80.99 square miles (209.8 km^{2}) of area, receives about 24.7 in/year (63 cm/year) of precipitation, and is about 2.80% forested.

== See also ==
- List of rivers of Nebraska
