= Bonesteel, South Dakota =

- City
- Location in Gregory County and the state of South Dakota
- Coordinates: 43°04′39″N 98°56′48″W
- Country: United States
- State: South Dakota
- County: Gregory
- Founded: 1902

Area
  - Total: 0.36 sq mi (0.92 km^{2})
  - Land: 0.36 sq mi (0.92 km^{2})
  - Water: 0 sq mi (0.00 km^{2})
- Elevation: 1,965 ft (599 m)

Population (2020)
  - Total: 258
  - Density: 729.7/sq mi (281.72/km^{2})
- Time zone: UTC-6 (Central (CST))
  - Summer (DST): UTC-5 (CDT)
- ZIP code: 57317
- Area code: 605
- FIPS code: 46-06220
- GNIS feature ID: 1267288
- Website: www.cityofbonesteel.com

Bonesteel is a city in Gregory County, South Dakota, United States. The population was 258 at the 2020 census.

== History ==
Bonesteel was laid out in 1902. The city named for H. E. Bonesteel, who operated as a freight forwarder in the area.

== Geography ==
According to the United States Census Bureau, the city has a total area of 0.35 square miles (0.91 km^{2}), all land.

== Demographics ==
Historical population
Census	Pop.	Note	%±
1910	563		—
1920	652		15.8%
1930	564		−13.5%
1940	532		−5.7%
1950	485		−8.8%
1960	452		−6.8%
1970	354		−21.7%
1980	358		1.1%
1990	297		−17.0%
2000	297		0.0%
2010	275		−7.4%
2020	258		−6.2%
U.S. Decennial Census

=== 2020 census ===
As of the 2020 census, Bonesteel had a population of 258. The median age was 50.3 years. 23.6% of residents were under the age of 18 and 32.6% of residents were 65 years of age or older.

For every 100 females there were 109.8 males, and for every 100 females age 18 and over there were 109.6 males age 18 and over.

0.0% of residents lived in urban areas, while 100.0% lived in rural areas.

There were 100 households in Bonesteel, of which 26.0% had children under the age of 18 living in them. Of all households, 54.0% were married-couple households, 24.0% were households with a male householder and no spouse or partner present, and 17.0% were households with a female householder and no spouse or partner present. About 30.0% of all households were made up of individuals and 16.0% had someone living alone who was 65 years of age or older.

There were 142 housing units, of which 29.6% were vacant. The homeowner vacancy rate was 0.0% and the rental vacancy rate was 40.0%.

Racial composition as of the 2020 census
Race	Number	Percent
White	194	75.2%
Black or African American	2	0.8%
American Indian and Alaska Native	47	18.2%
Asian	1	0.4%
Native Hawaiian and Other Pacific Islander	2	0.8%
Some other race	4	1.6%
Two or more races	8	3.1%
Hispanic or Latino (of any race)	4	1.6%

=== 2010 census ===
As of the census of 2010, there were 275 people, 125 households, and 74 families residing in the city. The population density was 785.7 inhabitants per square mile (303.4/km^{2}). There were 170 housing units at an average density of 485.7 per square mile (187.5/km^{2}). The racial makeup of the city was 73.5% White, 22.9% Native American, 1.8% from other races, and 1.8% from two or more races. Hispanic or Latino of any race were 4.0% of the population.

There were 125 households, of which 24.8% had children under the age of 18 living with them, 47.2% were married couples living together, 9.6% had a female householder with no husband present, 2.4% had a male householder with no wife present, and 40.8% were non-families. 38.4% of all households were made up of individuals, and 20% had someone living alone who was 65 years of age or older. The average household size was 2.20 and the average family size was 2.88.

The median age in the city was 49.8 years. 26.5% of residents were under the age of 18; 2.6% were between the ages of 18 and 24; 18.1% were from 25 to 44; 22.5% were from 45 to 64; and 30.2% were 65 years of age or older. The gender makeup of the city was 48.0% male and 52.0% female.

=== 2000 census ===
As of the census of 2000, there were 297 people, 137 households, and 90 families residing in the city. The population density was 863.1 inhabitants per square mile (333.2/km^{2}). There were 164 housing units at an average density of 476.6 per square mile (184.0/km^{2}). The racial makeup of the city was 90.57% White, 7.07% Native American, and 2.36% from two or more races. Hispanic or Latino of any race were 0.34% of the population.

There were 137 households, out of which 21.9% had children under the age of 18 living with them, 53.3% were married couples living together, 6.6% had a female householder with no husband present, and 34.3% were non-families. 33.6% of all households were made up of individuals, and 23.4% had someone living alone who was 65 years of age or older. The average household size was 2.09 and the average family size was 2.53.

In the city, the population was spread out, with 18.5% under the age of 18, 5.1% from 18 to 24, 16.5% from 25 to 44, 26.3% from 45 to 64, and 33.7% who were 65 years of age or older. The median age was 54 years. For every 100 females, there were 96.7 males. For every 100 females age 18 and over, there were 90.6 males.

The median income for a household in the city was $26,389, and the median income for a family was $30,833. Males had a median income of $21,500 versus $21,250 for females. The per capita income for the city was $13,621. About 8.0% of families and 14.6% of the population were below the poverty line, including 17.6% of those under the age of eighteen and 17.3% of those 65 or over.

== Climate ==
This climatic region is typified by large seasonal temperature differences, with warm to hot (and often humid) summers and cold (sometimes severely cold) winters. According to the Köppen Climate Classification system, Bonesteel has a humid continental climate, abbreviated "Dfa" on climate maps.

Climate data for Bonesteel, South Dakota
Month	Jan	Feb	Mar	Apr	May	Jun	Jul	Aug	Sep	Oct	Nov	Dec	Year
Mean daily maximum °C (°F)	−1 (30)	2 (36)	7 (45)	16 (60)	22 (71)	27 (81)	31 (87)	30 (86)	24 (76)	18 (64)	8 (46)	1 (34)	16 (60)
Mean daily minimum °C (°F)	−13 (8)	−11 (13)	−6 (22)	2 (35)	8 (46)	13 (56)	17 (62)	16 (60)	9 (49)	3 (37)	−5 (23)	−11 (13)	2 (35)
Average precipitation mm (inches)	10 (0.4)	18 (0.7)	41 (1.6)	76 (3)	110 (4.2)	94 (3.7)	81 (3.2)	69 (2.7)	69 (2.7)	46 (1.8)	23 (0.9)	10 (0.4)	640 (25.1)
Source: Weatherbase
