= Blackbird Creek (Redbird Creek tributary) =

Stream in Nebraska, U.S.

Blackbird Creek Tributary to Redbird Creek
- Location of Blackbird Creek mouth Blackbird Creek (Redbird Creek tributary) (the United States)

Location
- Country: United States
- State: Nebraska
- County: Holt

Physical characteristics
- Source: Elkhorn River divide
  - location: about 5 miles northeast of Emmet, Nebraska
  - coordinates: 42°31′40.01″N 098°41′32.32″W
  - elevation: 2,008 ft (612 m)
- Mouth: Redbird Creek
  - location: about 3 miles southeast of Midway, Nebraska
  - coordinates: 42°40′4.00″N 098°33′43.30″W
  - elevation: 1,801 ft (549 m)
- Length: 18.65 mi (30.01 km)
- Basin size: 40.85 square miles (105.8 km^{2})
- Discharge
  - location: Redbird Creek
  - average: 4.51 cu ft/s (0.128 m^{3}/s) at mouth with Redbird Creek

Basin features
- Progression: Redbird Creek → Niobrara River → Missouri River → Mississippi
- River system: Niobrara
- Bridges: 877th Road, US 281, 493rd Avenue (x2), 883rd Road, 493rd Avenue, 885th Road, 495th Avenue, 886th Road, 496th Avenue

Blackbird Creek is a 18.65 mi (30.01 km) long second-order tributary to Redbird Creek in Holt County, Nebraska.

== Course ==
Blackbird Creek rises on the Elkhorn River divide about 5 miles (8.0 km) northeast of Emmet, Nebraska in Holt County and then flows north and northeast to join Redbird Creek about 3 miles (4.8 km) southeast of Midway, Nebraska.

== Watershed ==
Blackbird Creek drains 40.85 square miles (105.8 km^{2}) of area, receives about 24.6 in/year (62 cm/year) of precipitation, and is about 0.56% forested.

== See also ==
- List of rivers of Nebraska
