= Anncar, Nebraska =

Unincorporated community in Nebraska, United States

- Unincorporated Community
- Location of Anncar within Nebraska Anncar, Nebraska (the United States)
- Coordinates: 42°48′26″N 98°44′36″W
- Country: United States
- State: Nebraska
- County: Holt

Anncar is an unincorporated community in Holt County, Nebraska, United States.

== History ==
A post office was established in Anncar in 1900, and remained in operation until being discontinued in 1931. Anncar is the portmanteau of the name of a settler, Ann Carroll.
