= Eagle Creek (Niobrara River tributary) =

Stream in Nebraska, U.S.

Eagle Creek Tributary to Niobrara River
- Location of Eagle Creek mouth Eagle Creek (Niobrara River tributary) (the United States)

Location
- Country: United States
- State: Nebraska
- County: Holt

Physical characteristics
- Source: confluence of East and Middle Branch of Eagle Creek
  - location: about 2.5 miles southeast of School No. 33
  - coordinates: 42°38′31.01″N 098°45′25.32″W
  - elevation: 1,768 ft (539 m)
- Mouth: Niobrara River
  - location: about 2 miles east of Paddock, Nebraska
  - coordinates: 42°46′48.00″N 098°33′42.30″W
  - elevation: 1,447 ft (441 m)
- Length: 19.99 mi (32.17 km)
- Basin size: 216.75 square miles (561.4 km^{2})
- Discharge
  - location: Niobrara River
  - average: 52.84 cu ft/s (1.496 m^{3}/s) at mouth with Niobrara River

Basin features
- Progression: Niobrara River → Missouri River → Mississippi
- River system: Niobrara
- Tributaries
  - left: Middle Branch Eagle Creek; Oak Creek
  - right: East Branch Eagle Creek; Honey Creek; Camp Creek
- Bridges: 887th Road, 488th Avenue, 490th Avenue, US 281, Oak Road, 893rd Road

Eagle Creek is a 19.99 mi (32.17 km) long third-order tributary to the Niobrara River in Holt County, Nebraska.

== Course ==
Eagle Creek begins at the confluence of Middle and East Branches of Eagle Creek about 2.5 miles (4.0 km) southeast of School No. 33 in Holt County and then flows generally northeast to join the Niobrara River about 2 miles (3.2 km) east of Paddock, Nebraska.

== Watershed ==
Eagle Creek drains 216.75 square miles (561.4 km^{2}) of area, receives about 24.6 in/year (62 cm/year) of precipitation, and is about 3.13% forested.

== See also ==
- List of rivers of Nebraska
