= East Branch Eagle Creek =

Stream in Nebraska, U.S.

East Branch Eagle Creek Tributary to Eagle Creek
- Location of East Branch Eagle Creek mouth East Branch Eagle Creek (the United States)

Location
- Country: United States
- State: Nebraska
- County: Holt

Physical characteristics
- Source: confluence of East and Middle Branch of Eagle Creek
  - location: about 1 mile southeast of School No. 157
  - coordinates: 42°29′56.01″N 098°44′18.32″W
  - elevation: 2,040 ft (620 m)
- Mouth: Eagle Creek
  - location: about 2.5 miles southeast of School No. 33
  - coordinates: 42°38′31.01″N 098°45′25.32″W
  - elevation: 1,768 ft (539 m)
- Length: 13.90 mi (22.37 km)
- Basin size: 53.40 square miles (138.3 km^{2})
- Discharge
  - location: Eagle Creek
  - average: 5.92 cu ft/s (0.168 m^{3}/s) at mouth with Eagle Creek

Basin features
- Progression: Eagle Creek → Niobrara River → Missouri River → Mississippi
- River system: Niobrara
- Bridges: 877th Road

East Branch Eagle Creek is a 13.90 mi (22.37 km) long second-order tributary to Eagle Creek in Holt County, Nebraska.

East Branch Eagle Creek rises on the Elkhorn River divide 1 mile (1.6 km) southeast of School No. 157 in Holt County and then flows north to join West Branch Eagle Creek forming Eagle Creek about 2.5 miles (4.0 km) southeast of School No. 33.

== Watershed ==
East Branch Eagle Creek drains 53.40 square miles (138.3 km^{2}) of area, receives about 24.6 in/year (62 cm/year) of precipitation, and is about 1.04% forested.

== See also ==
- List of rivers of Nebraska
