= Redbird, Nebraska =

Unincorporated community in Nebraska, U.S.

Coordinates: 42°45′42″N 98°26′33″W

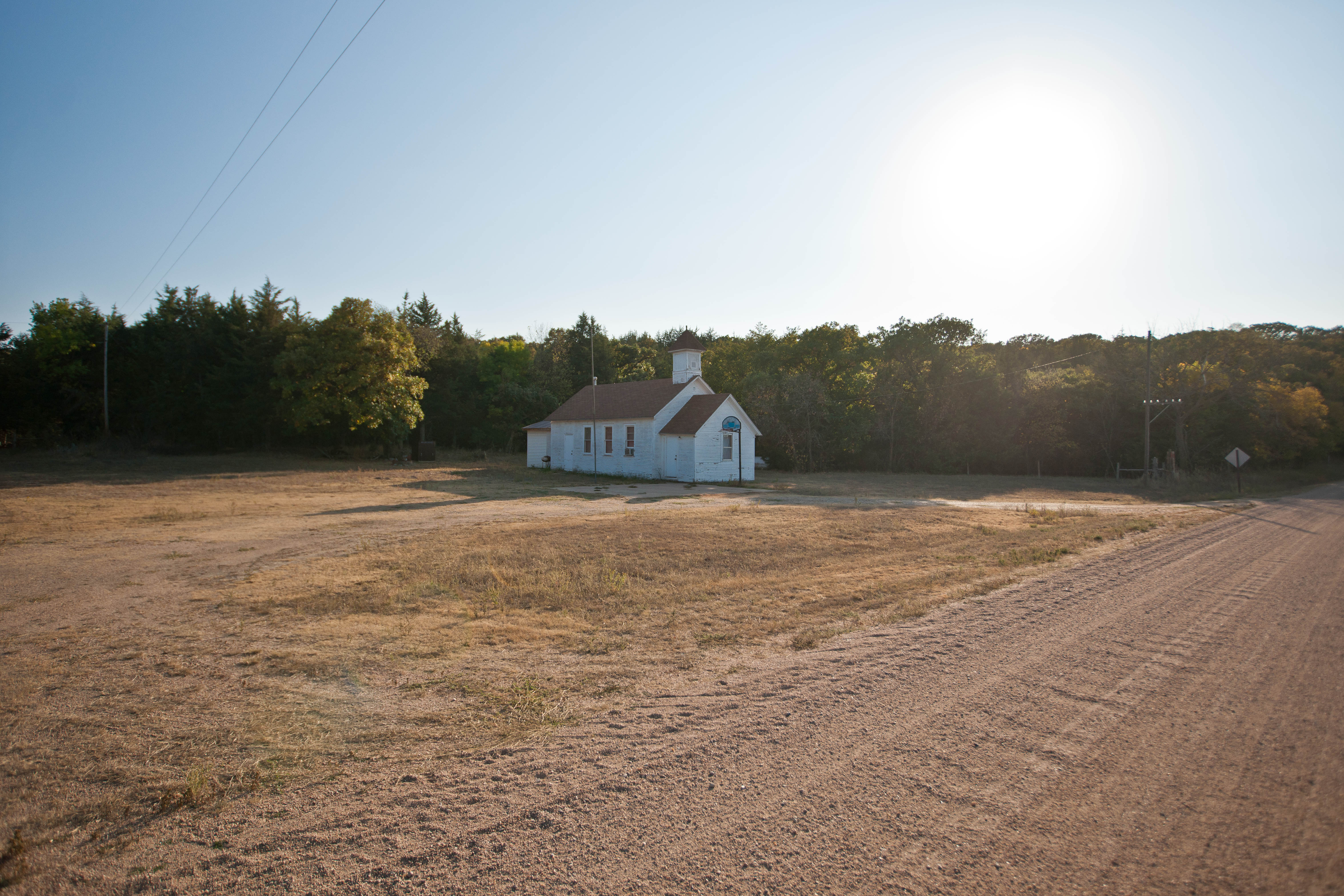
Redbird, Nebraska

Redbird is an unincorporated community in Holt County, Nebraska, United States.

== History ==
A post office was established at Redbird (also spelled Red Bird) in the 1870s. Redbird was named from Redbird Creek nearby.
