= Dorsey, Nebraska =

Unincorporated community in Nebraska, United States

- Unincorporated Community
- Location within Nebraska Location within the United States
- Coordinates: 42.7°N 98.3°W
- Country: United States
- State: Nebraska
- County: Holt

Dorsey is an unincorporated community in Holt County, Nebraska, United States.

== History ==
A post office was established at Dorsey in the 1880s. It was named for George Washington Emery Dorsey, a Representative to the United States Congress from Nebraska.
