= Tornadoes of 1962 =

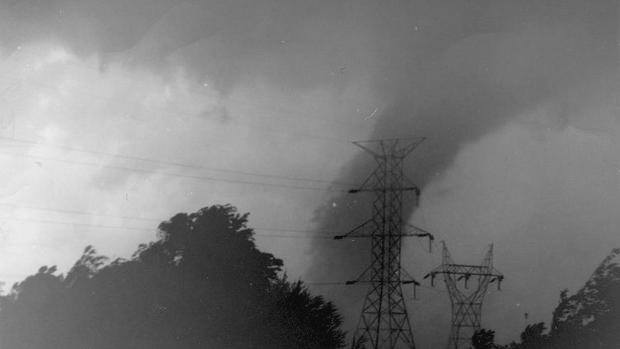
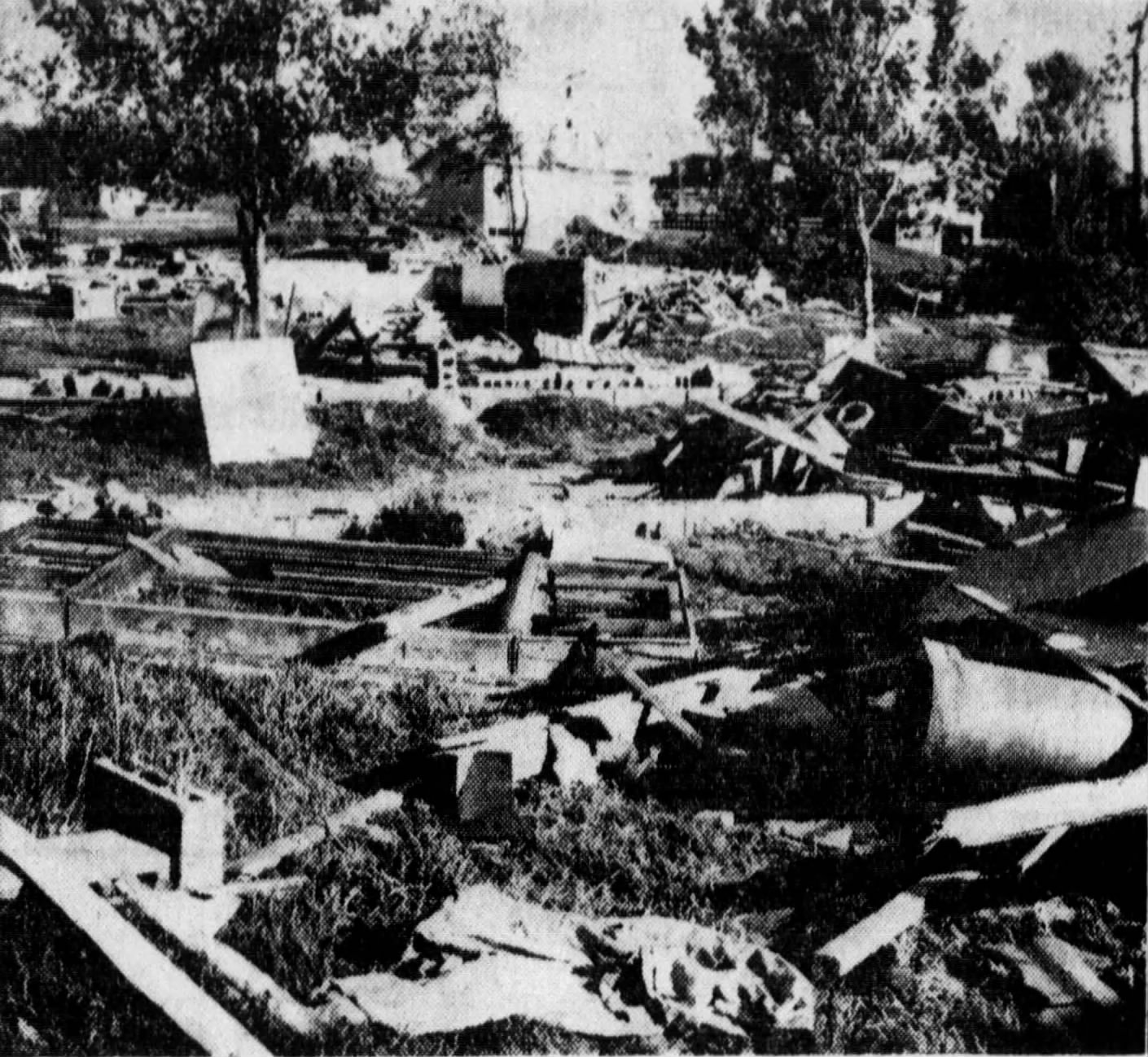
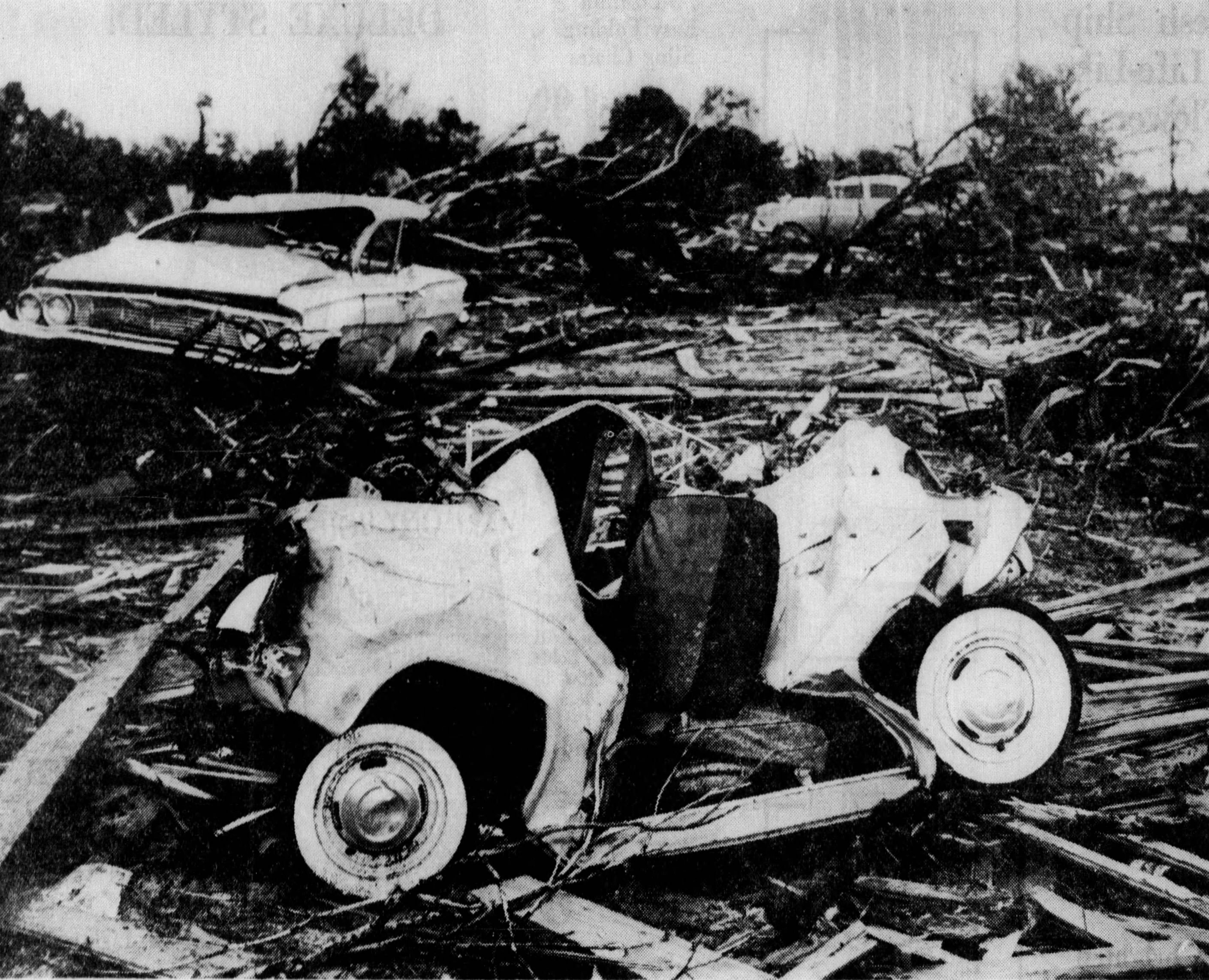
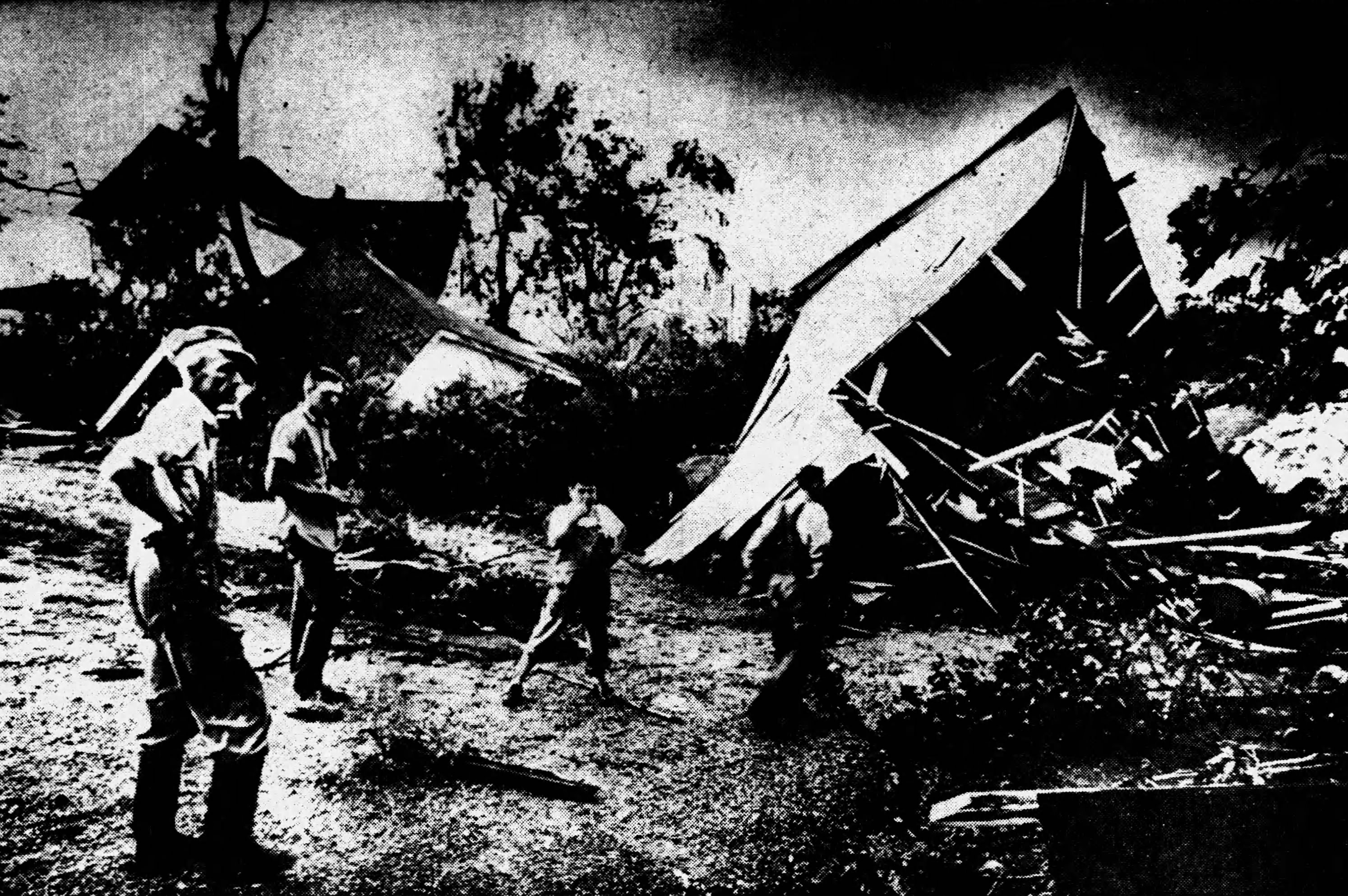
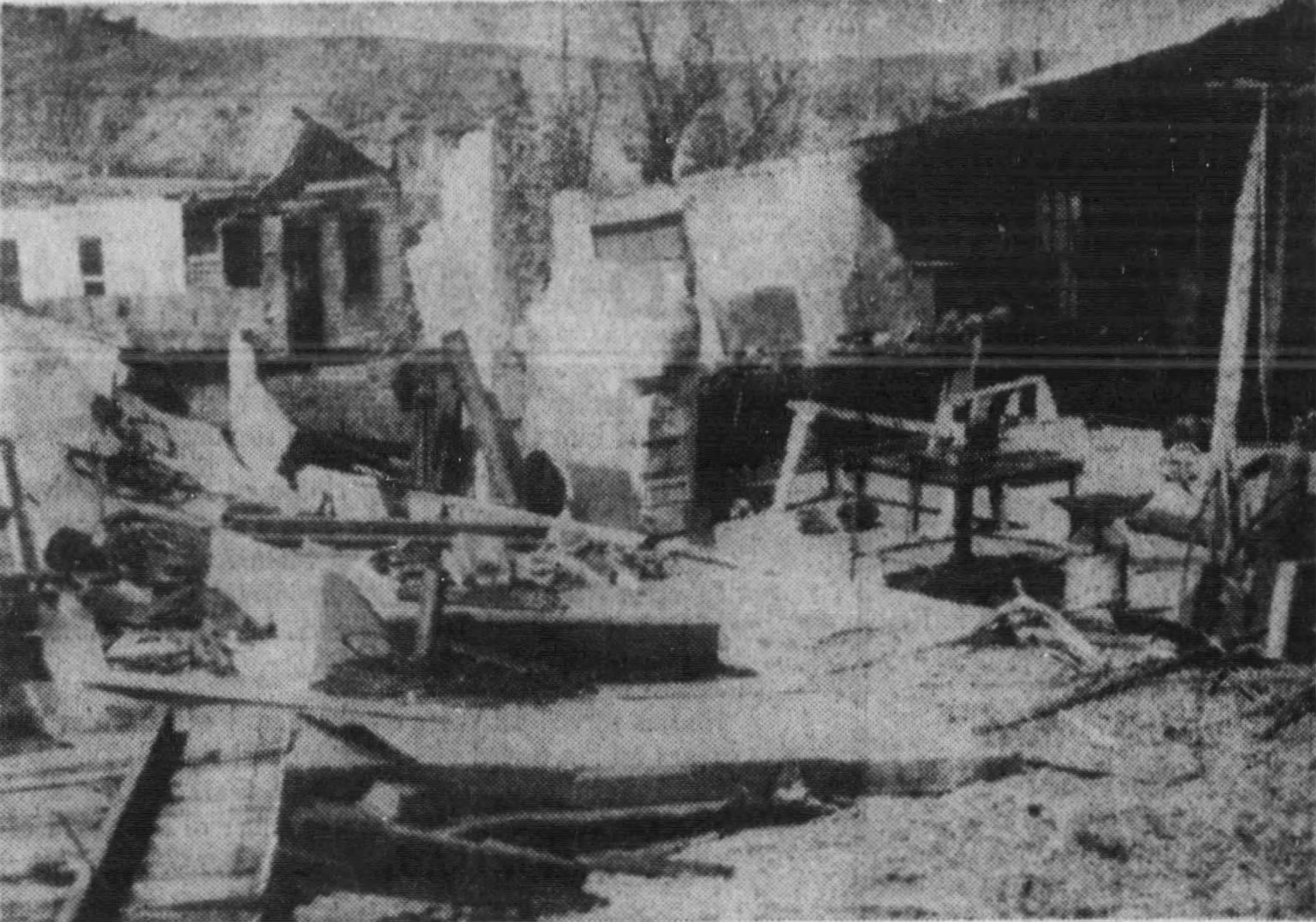
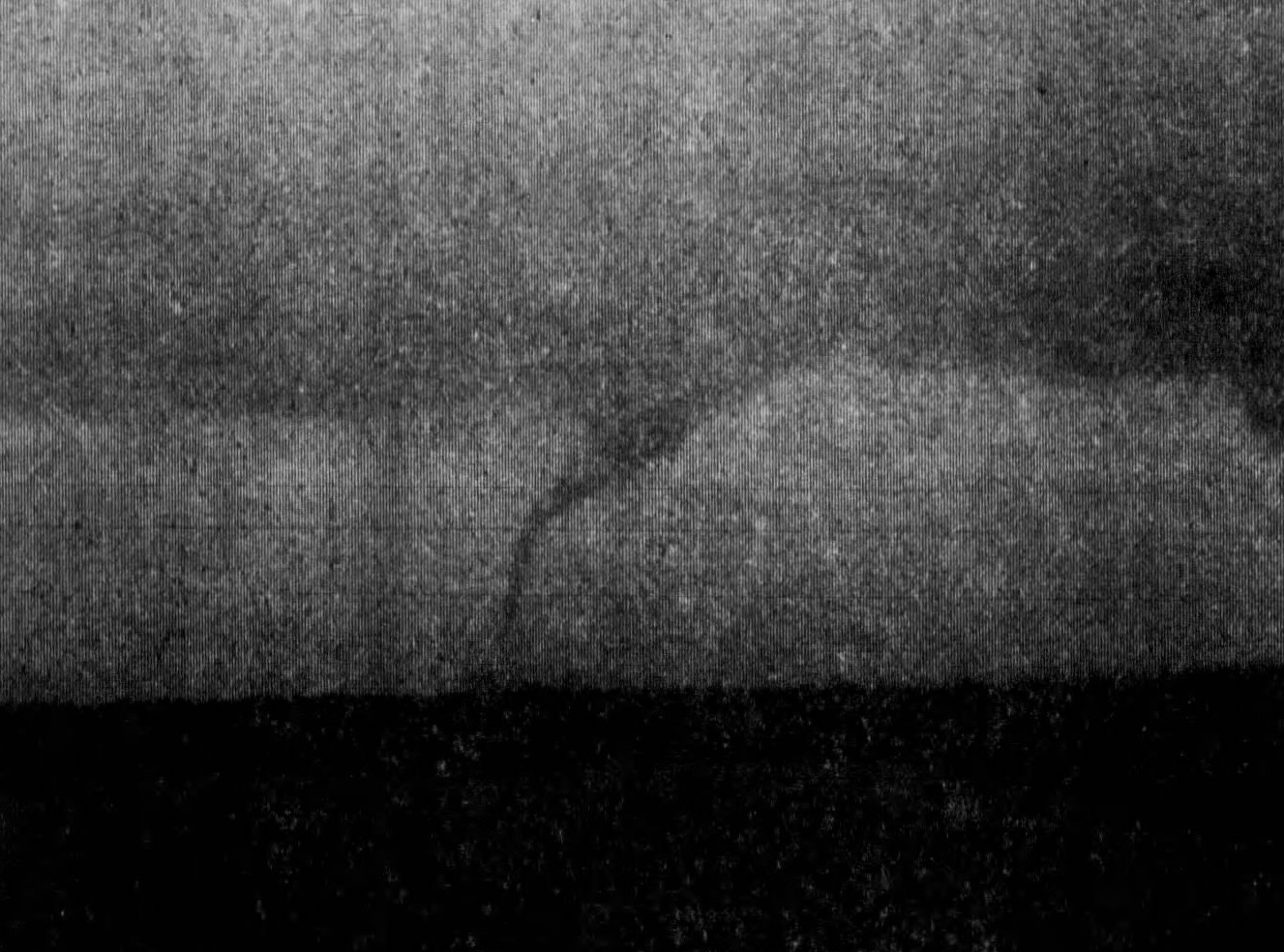
- Clockwise from top: An F3 tornado approaching Mitchell, South Dakota on May 21; A mangled vehicle after an early morning F3 tornado struck Milton, Florida on March 31; A destroyed business near Teapot Rock, Wyoming after an F2 tornado on June 11; A high-end F3 tornado near Spencer, Nebraska on May 21; A farm home near Holton, Kansas after an F4 tornado on August 6; The remains of a suburban home in Rochester, Minnesota after an F4 tornado on September 15.
- Timespan: 1962
Maximum rated tornado
F4 tornado
- List
  – Dill City, Oklahoma
  on May 24
  – Randlett-Cookietown, Oklahoma
  on May 26
  – Haskell, Texas
  on May 26
  – Bristow, Nebraska
  on May 29
  – Birmingham-Holton, Kansas
  on August 6
  – Rochester, Minnesota
  on September 16
- Tornadoes in U.S.: 657
- Damage (U.S.): Unknown
- Fatalities (U.S.): 30
- Fatalities (worldwide): >34

This page documents the tornadoes and tornado outbreaks of 1962, primarily (but not entirely) in the United States. Most tornadoes form in the U.S., although tornadoes events can take place internationally. Tornado statistics for older years like this often appear significantly lower than modern years due to fewer reports or confirmed tornadoes.

== Events ==
Fatal United States tornadoes in 1962
- Approximate touchdown location of killer tornadoes in 1962
Summary of tornadoes
- January 5 – Florida (1 death)
- March 31 – Florida (17 deaths)
- April 8 – Virginia (1 death)
- April 28 – Mississippi (1 death)
- May 8 – Virginia (1 death)
- May 22 – Iowa (1 death)
- May 24 – Connecticut (1 death)
- May 25 – Texas (1 death)
- August 20 – Ohio (4 deaths)
- August 28 – Louisiana (2 deaths)
Total fatalities: 30

=== United States yearly total ===
Confirmed tornadoes by Fujita rating
FU	F0	F1	F2	F3	F4	F5	Total
0	191	265	162	33	6	0	657

== January ==
There were 12 tornadoes confirmed in the US in January.

=== January 5–6 ===
FU	F0	F1	F2	F3	F4	F5
0	0	4	7	0	0	0

The first two tornadoes of the year struck Crestview, Florida at F2 intensity with the first one killing one, injuring 30, and kicking off an outbreak of 11 tornadoes across the Southeast. Later, another F2 tornado hit Destin, Florida. The next day, an F1 tornado injured one in Plum Branch, South Carolina. Overall, the outbreak killed one and injured 31.

== February ==
There were 25 tornadoes confirmed in the US in February.

=== February 11 (Denmark) ===
A high-end F3 tornado caused severe damage to the town of Holstebro and nearby areas. The tornado reached 500 meters wide (546.8 yards), and traveled 13 kilometers. ESWD mentions that it may have reached F4 intensity. More than 100 buildings were damaged, some severely damaged. 500 trees were uprooted or snapped on a plantation & debris was carried 13 km. Homes were badly damaged, or destroyed with roof loss or partial collapse. A well built brick apartment had its roof torn off and third floor half demolished, while other apartments in construction were severely damaged.

=== February 16 - 17 (Denmark) ===
Three tornadoes touched down in Denmark between February 16 & 17. On February 16, an F2 tornado struck Bedsted, destroying the roof of a farmhouse and causing cracks in another. On February 17, an F1 tornado struck Store Damme, damaging a thatched roof while another unrated tornado took a 7 km path from Høve to Ellinge Lyng, damaging 7 homes.

FU	F0	F1	F2	F3	F4	F5
1	0	1	1	0	0	0

=== February 19 ===
FU	F0	F1	F2	F3	F4	F5
0	1	1	0	0	0	0

Two weak tornadoes touched down in California. First, an F0 tornado caused damage in Irvine. This was followed by an F1 tornado that occurred west of Hockett Peak. There were no casualties from either tornado.

== March ==
There were 37 tornadoes confirmed in the US in March.

=== March 20–21 ===
FU	F0	F1	F2	F3	F4	F5
0	0	3	3	2	0	0

An outbreak of eight tornadoes hit the Southeast. On March 20, an F2 tornado injured two in Ponca, Alabama. Early the next morning, a squall line produced an F3 tornado that caused major damage and 10 injuries in Weaver, Alabama. Later, another F3 tornado caused considerable damage in Northern Atlanta suburbs of Hickory Flat, Avery, and Macedonia, Georgia. Overall, there were 12 injuries caused by the tornadoes.

=== March 22 ===
A rare F2 tornado damaged a farm building on the north side of Fresno, California.

=== March 30–31 ===
FU	F0	F1	F2	F3	F4	F5
0	0	7	2	2	0	0

A destructive outbreak of 11 tornadoes hit the Southeast with 10 of them occurring on March 31. A large, catastrophic, 1/4 mi (0.40 km) wide F3 tornado carved a 6.9 mi (11.1 km) path of devastation through the northwest side of Milton, Florida with little to no warning. Several neighborhood were wrecked with at least 130 homes being destroyed while many others were damaged. With 17 deaths, this was deadliest tornado ever recorded in Florida until 1998 as well as the deadliest of the year. There were 100 injuries as well. Overall, the outbreak killed 17 and injured 105.

== April ==
There were 41 tornadoes confirmed in the US in April.

=== April 8 ===
FU	F0	F1	F2	F3	F4	F5
0	2	1	0	0	0	0

Three weak, but destructive morning tornadoes hit the Southeast. A damaging F0 tornado traveled 64.1 miles (103.2 km), striking Clinton, Mt. Olive, Snow Hill, and Greenville, North Carolina. An F1 tornado then struck Hickory and Pungo south and east of Chesapeake, Virginia killing one. This was the only casualty from the tornadoes.

=== April 26–28 ===
FU	F0	F1	F2	F3	F4	F5
0	2	8	5	2	0	0

An outbreak of 17 tornadoes hit the Midwest and the Southeast. On April 26, a large F3 tornado damaged areas north of Sayre, Oklahoma. Another F3 tornado hit Sheppard Air Force Base north of Wichita Falls, Texas, injuring 13. The next morning, an F2 tornado caused heavy damage in Woodchuck, Louisiana. On April 28, a massive mile-wide, long-tracked F2 tornado struck rural areas in Mississippi, including the town of Prichard, killing one, injuring six, and ending the outbreak. Overall, the outbreak killed one and injured 19.

=== April 30 ===
FU	F0	F1	F2	F3	F4	F5
0	2	6	7	2	0	0

An outbreak of 17 tornadoes hit the Midwest and Mississippi Valley. One of the first strong tornadoes of the outbreak was also the worst of the day: a long-tracked F3 tornado that passed through Ardmore, Northern South Bend, and Notre Dame, Indiana, injuring 49. Another F3 tornado then caused considerable damage in Kouts, Indiana. An F2 tornado then injured five in Kentland, Indiana. That evening, another F2 tornado injured two in rural Columbia County, Arkansas. The final tornado to cause injuries was an F1 tornado that passed near Forest and Pioneer, Louisiana, injuring one. Overall, the outbreak injured 57.

== May ==
There were 200 tornadoes confirmed in the US in May. May 14 started an extremely active period of tornadoes with at least one confirmed everyday until June 25.

=== May 7–8 ===
FU	F0	F1	F2	F3	F4	F5
0	1	1	7	1	0	0

An outbreak sequence of 10 tornadoes hit the Great Plains, Midwest, and Virginia. The first strong tornado of the outbreak caused F2 damage in Collins, Iowa. Later, another F2 tornado struck Winslow, Nebraska, injuring five. An F3 tornado then occurred north of Davenport, Iowa. The next day, a rare F2 tornado struck Lapwai, Idaho, only the second of 10 official F2 tornadoes to hit the state. The final tornado of the outbreak then occurred as a fatal F2 tornado killed one and injured two northwest of Amber Lake, Virginia. In the end, the outbreak killed one and injured seven.

=== May 14–31 ===
FU	F0	F1	F2	F3	F4	F5
0	60	65	43	15	4	0

A massive, long-lived outbreak sequence of 188 tornadoes impacted 25 states in the Continental United States as part of a long-lived period of active severe weather. On May 14, a massive, long-tracked, 1-mile-wide (1.6 km) F3 tornado struck Burton and Mills, Nebraska as well as Bonesteel, South Dakota, injuring eight along its 53.8-mile-path (86.6 km). Later, another massive, long-tracked, 1-mile-wide (1.6 km) F3 tornado struck Mitchell, Forestburg, Huron, and Morningside, South Dakota, injuring two on its 70.4-mile-path (113.3 km). On May 21, a large, long-tracked, 500-yard-wide (460 m) F3 tornado struck Tilden and Hartington, Nebraska, injuring seven on its 71.1-mile-path (114.4 km). Later, another intense F3 tornado shredded Mitchell, South Dakota, injuring 32. An F2 tornado killed one in Iowa City, Iowa on May 22. The worst event occurred on May 24, when a catastrophic F3 tornado struck Bunker Hill, Fairmount, Waterville, Wolcott, Southington, Connecticut in the suburbs of Waterbury, causing near-F4 damage at times, killing one and injuring 50. On May 25, a violent F4 tornado injured nine in Dill City, Oklahoma. A deadly F3 tornado then struck Radium and Plainview, Texas, killing one and injuring another. On May 26, a violent 400-yard-wide (370 m) F4 tornado passed near Randlett and Cookietown, Oklahoma. F4, F1, and F2 tornadoes then pummeled Haskell, Texas, injuring one. Overall, the outbreak sequence killed three and injured 168.

=== May 14 (Austria) ===
A low-end F2/T4 tornado hit St. Margarethen, Burgenland.

== June ==
There were 171 tornadoes confirmed in the US in June.

=== June 7 ===
FU	F0	F1	F2	F3	F4	F5
0	3	3	4	0	0	0

A rare F1 tornado touched down in Mayagüez, Puerto Rico, causing extensive damage. This was followed by a small outbreak of nine tornadoes in Texas and Kansas. Three tornadoes, two rated F2 and the other rated F0, caused damage in and around Silverton, Texas. Another F2 tornado hit the northwest side of Rotan, Texas. One final F2 tornado occurred east of McAllaster, Kansas. None of the tornadoes caused casualties.

=== June 23 ===
FU	F0	F1	F2	F3	F4	F5
0	2	2	2	0	0	0

A small outbreak of six tornadoes hit Wisconsin, Illinois, and Kansas. An F2 tornado caused major damage when it moved directly through Thorp, Wisconsin. Another F2 tornado injured 10 in the Southern Chicago suburbs of Oak Forest and Markham, Illinois. These were the only casualties that day.

== July ==
There were 78 tornadoes confirmed in the US in July.

== August ==
There were 51 tornadoes confirmed in the US in August.

=== August 5–6 ===
FU	F0	F1	F2	F3	F4	F5
0	0	5	3	1	1	0

A small, but destructive outbreak of 10 tornadoes struck the Eastern Dakotas and Northeastern Kansas. Eight of the tornadoes occurred in Kansas, including a large, violent 667 yd (610 m) wide F4 tornado that caused the only casualties during the event when it moved directly through Holton and Birmingham, Kansas on August 6, injuring three. An F3 tornado also caused major damage on the southwest side of Baldwin City, Kansas later that day.

=== August 20 ===
FU	F0	F1	F2	F3	F4	F5
0	0	0	3	0	0	0

Three F2 tornadoes touched down in Maine, Texas, and Ohio. The first one moved in an unusual westward motion, damaging Hutchins Corner southwest of Wellington, Maine. The second one impacted the southeast side of Mathis, Texas. The final one was the most catastrophic of the three: it struck Brook Park, Ohio in the southwestern suburbs of Cleveland, causing major damage, killing four, and injuring 20.

=== August 28 ===
FU	F0	F1	F2	F3	F4	F5
0	1	1	0	0	0	0

Two weak tornadoes touched down in Louisiana. However, the second one, which was rated F1, caused major damage in Cameron, killing two and injuring 30.

== September ==
There were 24 tornadoes confirmed in the US in September.

=== September 7 (Belarus) ===
A high-end F2 tornado struck Vyetka, Belarus and surrounding villages at around 5 p.m. EEST. The cyclone first completely destroyed two houses along the Sozh river and water was sucked out. Several houses in the city were severely damaged and deroofed.

=== September 15–16 ===
FU	F0	F1	F2	F3	F4	F5
0	0	1	1	0	1	0

A localized, but devastating series of three tornadoes impacted South Dakota and Minnesota. First, an F1 tornado caused considerable damage north of Parmelee during the afternoon of September 15. Early the next morning, a violent F4 tornado ripped through Southeastern Rochester, Minnesota, injuring 34. The final tornado occurred shortly thereafter when an F2 tornado damaged parts of Pleasant Grove, Minnesota.

=== September 28 ===
A tornado hit Seattle, Washington with windspeeds estimated at 100 mph. It damaged the home of Bill Gates, who was six years old at the time.

== October ==
There were 11 tornadoes confirmed in the US in October.

=== October 27 (Spain) ===
A strong F1 tornado in Isla del Moral killed a person across a 6.9 km long path.

== November ==
There were 5 tornadoes confirmed in the US in November.

=== November 9 ===
An F1 tornado injured one in Miami, Florida.

== December ==
There were 2 tornadoes confirmed in the US in December.

=== December 14 (Spain) ===
A strong F1 tornado in Brenes killed 3 and injured 30 others.

== See also ==
- Tornado
  - Tornadoes by year
  - Tornado records
  - Tornado climatology
  - Tornado myths
- List of tornado outbreaks
  - List of F5 and EF5 tornadoes
  - List of North American tornadoes and tornado outbreaks
  - List of 21st-century Canadian tornadoes and tornado outbreaks
  - List of European tornadoes and tornado outbreaks
  - List of tornadoes and tornado outbreaks in Asia
  - List of Southern Hemisphere tornadoes and tornado outbreaks
  - List of tornadoes striking downtown areas
  - List of tornadoes with confirmed satellite tornadoes
- Tornado intensity
  - Fujita scale
  - Enhanced Fujita scale
