= Tornado outbreak sequence of May 14–31, 1962 =

Weather event in the United States

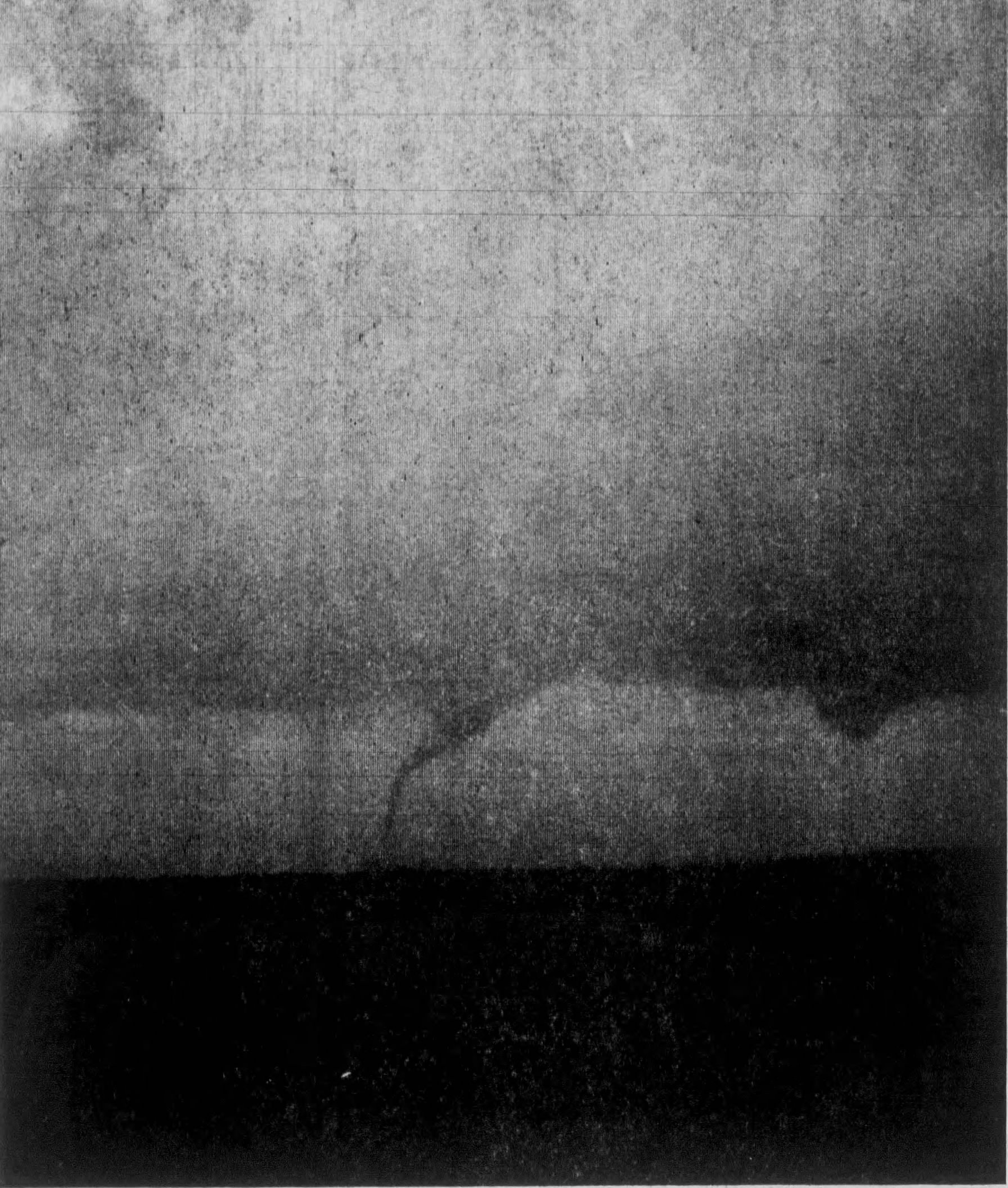
- A high-end F3 tornado near Spencer, Nebraska on May 21

Meteorological history
- Formed: May 14, 1962
- Dissipated: May 31, 1962

Tornado outbreak
- Tornadoes: 188
- Max. rating: F4 tornado
- Duration: 17 days, 8 hours, 30 minutes
- Highest gusts: 100 miles per hour (160 km/h)
- Largest hail: 6 inches (15 cm)

Overall effects
- Casualties: 3 fatalities (+27 non-tornadic), 168 injuries (+85 non-tornadic)
- Damage: $33.450 million (1962 USD)
- Areas affected: Contiguous United States, especially the Great Plains and Connecticut
- Part of the tornado outbreaks of 1962

A long-lived, destructive tornado outbreak sequence caused widespread damage and numerous casualties across the United States during mid- to late-May 1962. Over the course of 18 days, 188 tornadoes touched down across 25 states from California to Connecticut. There were 62 significant (F2+) tornadoes during the event, including 15 F3 tornadoes and four F4 tornadoes. In addition to the tornadoes, storms across the region produced destructive straight-line winds, large hail, heavy rainfall that led to flash flooding, and frequent lightning. Overall, the outbreak sequence caused three fatalities, 168 injuries, and caused $33.450 million in damage. There were additional casualties that occurred as a result of non-tornadic weather events as well.

== Meteorological synopsis ==
A persistent weather pattern brought almost daily severe and tornadic storms to the Great Plains as multiple low-pressure systems moved northward through the region due to a ridge to the east. In Nebraska and South Dakota, multiple strong tornadoes moved over the same areas on different days with Nebraska also seeing a violent tornado. One particularly devastating F3 tornado injured 32 in Mitchell, South Dakota. May 22 also saw a fatality when an F2 tornado struck Iowa City, Iowa. In the Northeastern United States, several stray tornadoes touched down and caused minor to major damage. Connecticut saw the most casualties from one tornado when an F3 tornado struck the northern suburbs of Waterbury, causing near-F4 damage, killing one, and injuring 50. Oklahoma and Texas saw three of the four violent tornadoes from the outbreak during the latter part of May. May 25, saw an F4 tornado injure nine in Dill City, Oklahoma while an F3 tornado killed one and injured another in Radium, Texas. Although the worst tornadoes happened during the outbreak sequence, the active period of daily tornadoes did not officially end until June 25. In addition to the tornadoes, widespread non-tornadic impacts occurred with lightning and flooding causing most of the non-tornadic casualties.

== Confirmed tornadoes ==
Confirmed tornadoes by Fujita rating
FU	F0	F1	F2	F3	F4	F5	Total
0	63	68	47	15	4	0	198

=== Burton–Mills, Nebraska/Bonesteel, South Dakota ===
Burton–Mills, Nebraska/Bonesteel, South Dakota
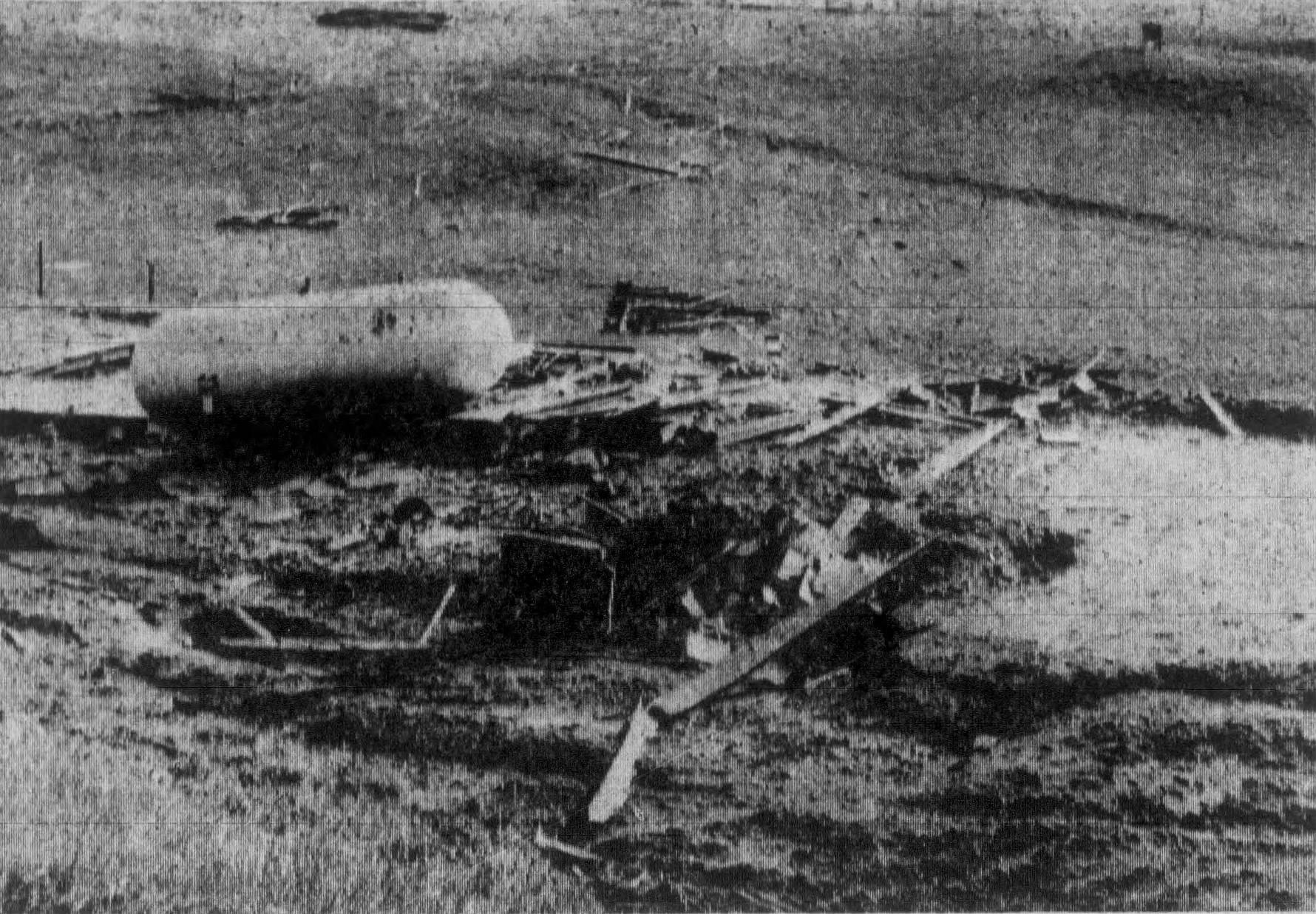
- A schoolhouse that was wiped out by the tornado near Naper

F3 tornado
- on the Fujita scale

Overall effects
- Injuries: 8
- Damage: $250,000

This massive, intense, long-tracked F3 tornado touched down well northwest of Springview and southeast of Naper, Nebraska on May 14 and moved northeast, striking the towns Burton and Mills. Nine farmsteads were obliterated, six others were partially destroyed, and one other one was damaged heavily damaged. Four of the farms had every building including the home swept away. In all, 10 homes were destroyed with debris from them scattered up to 5 miles (8.0 km) away. The tornado then crossed the state line and struck Bonesteel, South Dakota before dissipating. It traveled 53.8 miles (86.6 km) and was 1 mile (1.6 km) wide. It injured eight and caused $250,000 in damage. The tornado track may have been much longer as possible tornado damage was observed all the way to Carthage, South Dakota, a total distance of about 120 miles (190 km). The tornado was rated F4 by Grazulis.

=== Southern Corsica–Mitchell–Forestburg–Huron, South Dakota ===
Southern Corsica–Mitchell–Forestburg–Huron, South Dakota
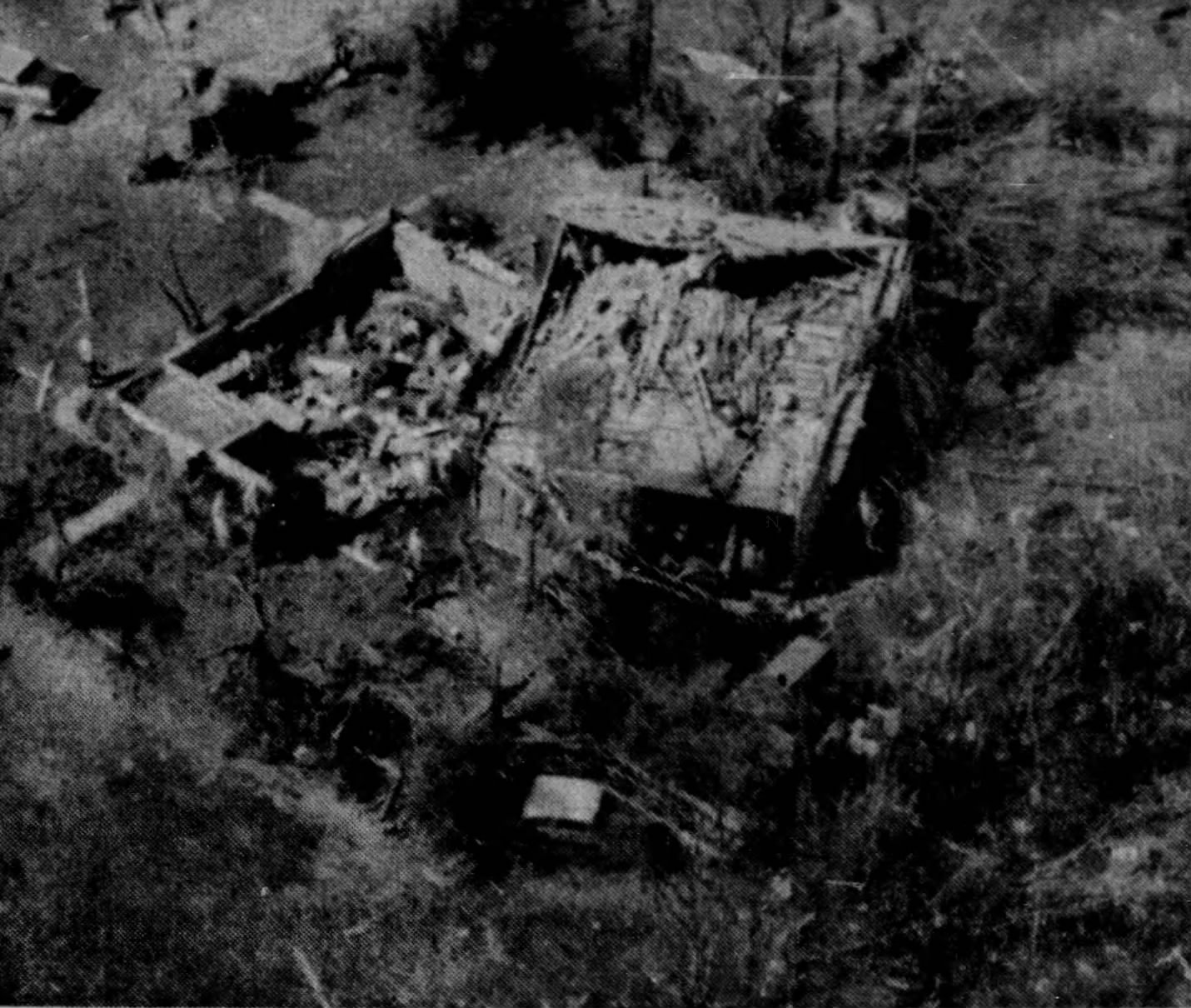
- A farmhouse removed from its foundation west of Ethan, South Dakota

F3 tornado
- on the Fujita scale

Overall effects
- Injuries: 2

This massive, intense, long-tracked F3 tornado was a possible continuation of the earlier large F3 tornado in Nebraska above. It is officially labeled to have touched down south of Corsica and moved northeast, before turning almost due north while passing northwest of Ethan, striking Mitchell, Forestburg, Huron, and Morningside before dissipating east of Broadland. It traveled 70.4 miles (113.3 km), was 1 mile (1.6 km) wide, and injured two. Despite the destruction, no monetary damage value was given.

=== Closter−Tilden–Hartington–Wynot, Nebraska ===
Closter−Tilden–Hartington–Wynot, Nebraska
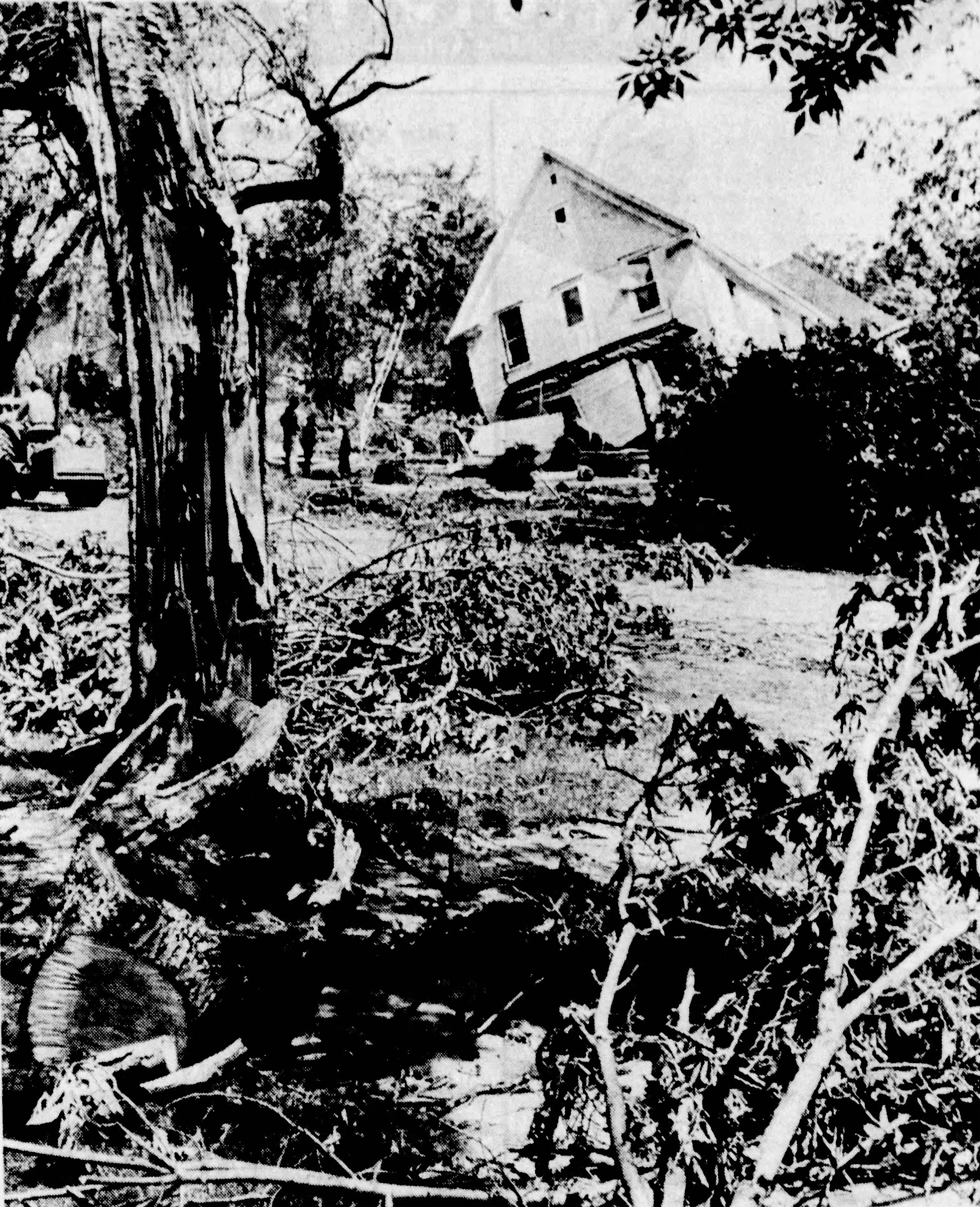
- A home in Tilden left leaning after the tornado

F3 tornado
- on the Fujita scale

Overall effects
- Injuries: 7
- Damage: $10 million

Long-tracked, large F3 tornado family touched down just north-northwest of Closter on May 21 and moved north-northeast, strengthening as it struck Tilden. There was major damage in the town with some areas being completely destroyed. Six people were injured in Tilden with losses totaling at least $1 million. Turning northeast, the tornado weakened and may have lifted temporarily, with a funnel cloud being spotted aloft just southwest of McLean and east of Osmond. Damage was sporadic and of varying intensities until the tornado touched down solidly again as it approached Hartington. Major damage occurred in the town as walls and roofs being blown off of businesses and homes with losses totaling at least $100,000. One person was also injured. The tornado continued northeast, barely missing St. James and Wynot to the east before dissipating over the Missouri River just before crossing into South Dakota.

The tornado was on the ground for at least an hour and 10 minutes, traveled 71.7 miles (115.4 km), and was 500 yards (460 m) wide. Seven people were injured and losses totaled $10 million. Gusty winds and hail accompanied the tornado as well.

=== Mitchell, South Dakota ===
Mitchell, South Dakota
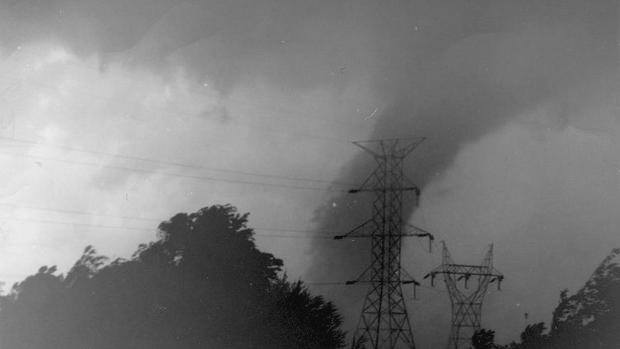
- The tornado as seen approaching Mitchell

F3 tornado
- on the Fujita scale

Overall effects
- Injuries: 32
- Damage: $2.5 million

This devastating F3 tornado, which occurred on the same day as the tornado above, may have started just north Armour, where a farm place was demolished with the house swept from its foundation and other buildings ripped to pieces. A tornado was also reported west of Ethan before the tornado is said to have officially touched down on the west side of Mitchell and proceeded northeast, causing catastrophic damage. A home on West 4th Avenue "exploded" into pieces, tossing its occupants down the street, including two children that were miraculously found safe after the tornado dropped them a block away, with nothing more than a few cuts and bruises. Their parents were also injured with the father sustaining a severe head injury that he never recovered from, dying five years later, although it was not officially counted. Further northeast at Herbie's Diner, two employees took cover in a walk-in cooler just as the café was being obliterated. Five people were trapped under the debris at the diner and three of the women had been burned by the hot water from the coffeemaker. They were all rescued, and not were seriously injured. Eight people were spared as they had jumped inside a car parked inside a nearby gas station as the tornado hit. A roar like a large freight train was heard as the tornado struck the café as well. The tornado then caused more destruction on the north side of Mitchell. Several other homes were destroyed or extensively damaged and a trailer in the area was blown away. A police car with two Mitchell police officers was picked up and tossed across a street with a 4-by-4 post being driven through the back window. Both officers survived thanks to the metal grate that separates the back and front seats. Many other cars and trucks were demolished and, in some extreme cases, strands of straw were propelled through car radiators. Huge, wide trees up to 40 to 60 feet (12 to 18 m) tall were uprooted and many roads were blocked by downed trees and other debris. The tornado weakened and dissipated shortly after exiting the city.

The tornado traveled officially 1 mile (1.6 km) and was 167 yards (153 m) wide. A total of 15 businesses were demolished and several buildings were reduced to rubble, causing parts of Mitchell to look like it had been bombed. A total of 32 people were injured and damage was estimated at $2.5 million. It was the worst tornado to hit the region until May 30, 1998, when an F4 tornado destroyed the small town of Spencer, killing six people and injuring 150 others.

=== Iowa City, Iowa ===
Iowa City, Iowa
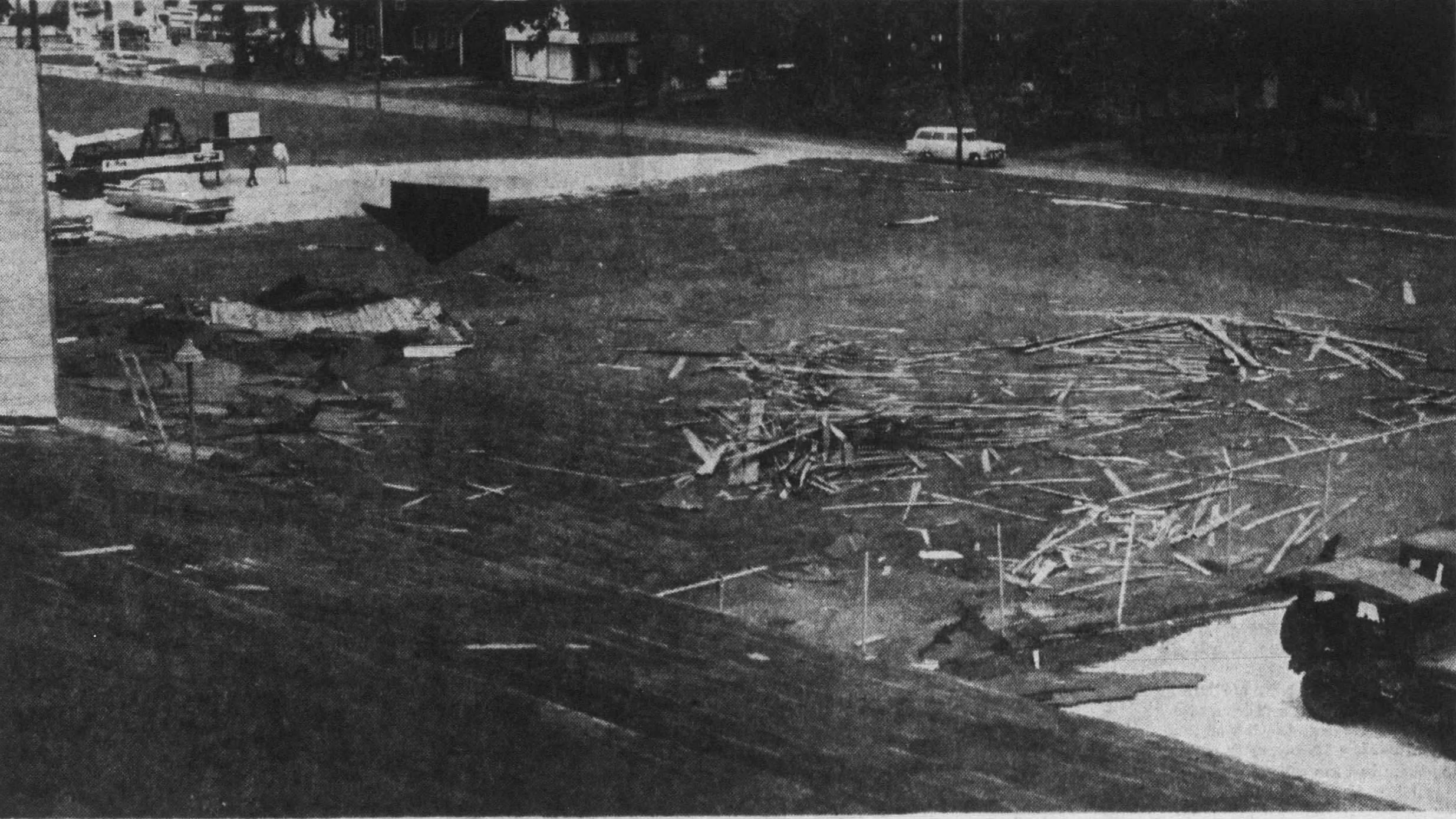
- The scattered remains of a roof structure after the tornado.

F2 tornado
- on the Fujita scale

Overall effects
- Fatalities: 1
- Damage: $250,000

A large and destructive F2 tornado touched down within the city limits of Iowa City, Iowa on May 22 and moved northeast, striking the southern and eastern part of town. It first struck the Iowa City Trailer Park, where three trailers were damaged by falling trees. An 80 miles per hour (130 km/h) wind gust was measured at the Iowa City Airport as the storm passed just barely to the southeast. The tornado then crossed over the Iowa River and struck the national guard armory. A quarter of the roof of the block-long building was ripped off with most of it landing in a pile that looked like kindling wood in the front yard. Further along the path, a large tree fell on a two-story home while another large tree fell on and obliterated a garage while damaging the car inside it. Numerous trees were snapped or uprooted as the tornado continued northeastward and numerous power and transmission lines were downed before it dissipated.

The tornado tracked 4.1 miles (6.6 km) and was 800 yards (730 m) wide. Although it not immediately deemed as such, a damage survey, as well as an eyewitness's account of seeing a lowering followed by "two tails" hanging below as it moved through the city, confirmed that a tornado had taken place. One person was killed and damage was estimated at $250,000. Despite the damage, Grazulis did not list the tornado as an F2 or stronger.

=== Bunker Hill–Fairmount–Waterville–Wolcott–Southington, Connecticut ===
Bunker Hill–Fairmount–Waterville–Wolcott–Southington, Connecticut
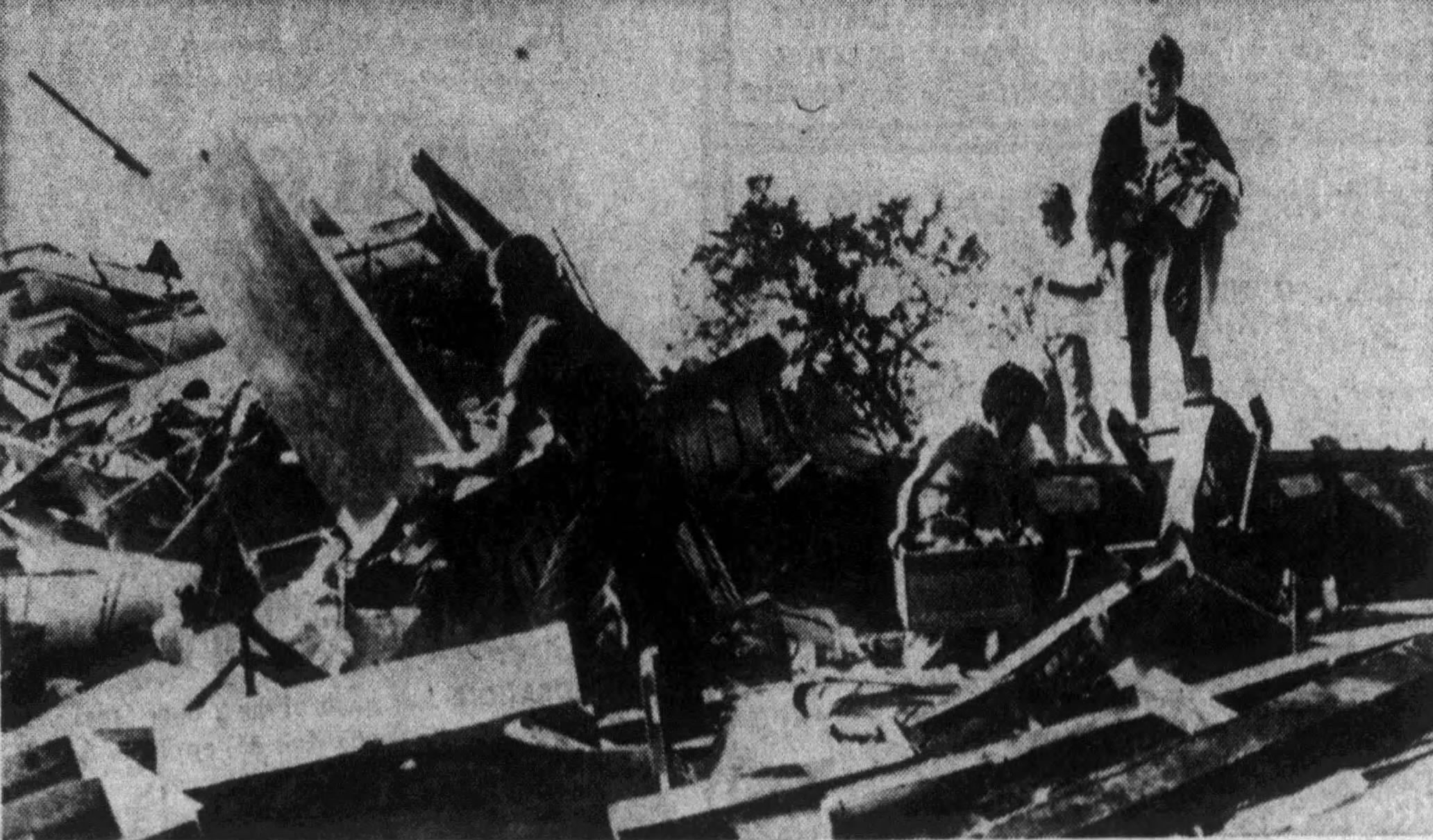
- The destroyed remains of a three-story home in Waterbury

F3 tornado
- on the Fujita scale

Overall effects
- Fatalities: 1
- Injuries: 50
- Damage: $5 million

On May 24, this highly destructive and deadly F3 tornado touched down along Middlebury Road (US 6A) (present-day Route 64) near Hillcrest in the extreme northeastern part of Middlebury. It moved erratically and slowly in a general east to northeastwardly path as it moved first along and then over the Straits Turnpike (Route 63) and through the south side of Watertown at only 12 miles per hour (19 km/h). Several walls at the new Engineered Plastics plant that was under construction on Commercial Street, the road that runs parallel to Straits Turnpike, were knocked down, a nearby construction shed was flattened, and dozens of trees and power lines were blown down on this part of the path. It then struck Dion's Restaurant, where it blew out windows, knocked down a sign, and tossed a car 40 feet (12 m) in the air before depositing it upside-down in a field. A well-digging rig located at the State Dairy property was blown over and windows at Pioneer Volkswagen were blown out. The tornado then moved through a wooded area before it strengthened to near peak intensity as it moved through Bunker Hill at F3 intensity before strengthening to its peak as it struck Fairmount and Waterville at high-end F3 intensity north of Waterbury. At all three locations, homes were flattened or had their roofs torn completely away with the residential area of Fairmount being completely destroyed at "near-F4" intensity. At nearby Waterville, part of the residential area and the most of industrial area was completely destroyed. Half of the Waterville Bible Church was destroyed, the roof of the Sprague School gym was blown off, and a lumber company and a corrugated cardboard manufacturer were obliterated with pieces of the buildings being tossed into the Naugatuck River. A man within this part of the damage path between Bunker Hill and Waterville was attempting to seek shelter in his home when he was struck by a large tree limb, killing him instantly.

The tornado then weakened some, but remained strong as it continued eastward in the direction of Wolcott and Woodtick. Several homes along a 200 to 300 yd (180 to 270 m) wide swath suffered major damage before the tornado crossed Route 69 (Wolcott Road), lifting an Armour Inc. refrigeration truck off the ground and dumping it into the Mad River, although the driver escaped with only minor injuries. A utility pole was also knocked down, cutting off power to the region. It then moved down a hill, taking out several homes and businesses, including Town and Country Cleaners, Jerri's Snack Bar, and Wolcott Insurance Agency. The tornado then moved up another hill, ripping the roof of the garage of a home and tossing it about 100 feet (30 m) while a tree fell on top of the car parked in the garage. A 150-year-old home nearby had half of its roof torn off and scattered as far as 200 feet (61 m) away. The tornado then skipped over a few houses before removing another roof off of a house and damaging several more homes as it passed just south of Wolcott and north of Woodtick. On a farm in this area, a fire broke out less than 300 feet (91 m) from a dynamite storage plant, although this was quickly extinguished by the fire department. A cow barn was obliterated and a small log cabin lost its roof before the tornado accelerated to about 25–35 miles per hour (40–56 km/h) as it moved through a meadow toward Southington, leaving behind a 200 yd (180 m) path through it. It restrengthened back to high-end F3 intensity and again caused "near-F4" damage to numerous homes and other buildings in Plantsville before it weakened for the final time as it passed through Southington. It dissipated northeast of town shortly thereafter, although the funnel was still seen depositing debris as far east as Manchester.

The tornado was on the ground for at least 30 minutes, traveled 11.6 miles (18.7 km), and was 120 yards (110 m) wide (Storm Data says the tornado was between 30 and 200 yards (27 and 183 m) wide). A total of 70 structures were destroyed, 175 others were heavily damaged, and 600 more were moderately damaged, with all the contents in the buildings being partially or totally demolished. Utilities were severely disrupted and hundreds of trees were knocked down as well. One person was killed, 50 others were injured, and damage was estimated at $5 million. Debris from the storm, which generated a 5 mi (8.0 km) swath of hail between .75 and 1.5 inches (1.9 and 3.8 cm) in diameter, was found as far away as Rhode Island and Massachusetts.

=== Dill City, Oklahoma ===
Dill City, Oklahoma
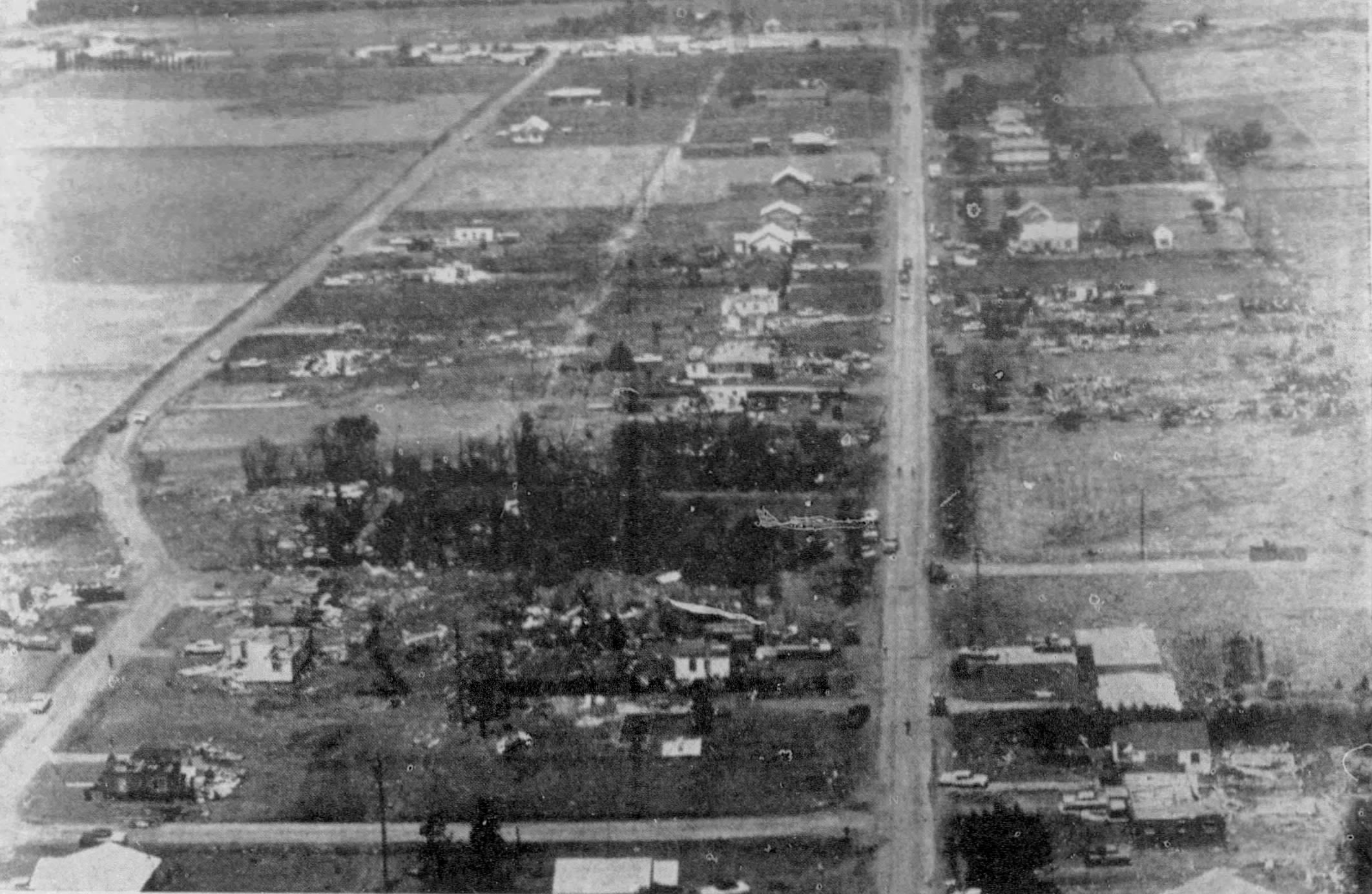
- An aerial of Dill City after the tornado

F4 tornado
- on the Fujita scale

Overall effects
- Injuries: 9
- Damage: $250,000

This large, violent, multi-vortex F4 tornado reportedly touched down onto two farms 3 miles (4.8 km) west of Dill City and immediately became intense, destroying buildings and killing 400 turkeys. As the tornado moved eastward toward Dill City, it began to display characteristics of not having a full condensation funnel, which was confirmed by observers who claimed the tornadic funnel lifted briefly into the air by about 100 feet (30 m). The tornado was spotted by a Highway Patrol Unit at around 6:20 pm west of the city. The storm was described by witnesses as having two distinct vortices rotating within the main tornado circulation. The tornado was observed with a full condensation funnel as it approached the west edge of town at 6:28 pm. The tornado cut a 750 yd (690 m) damage swath of destruction across eight blocks of the northern part of Dill City before continuing east, causing destruction to farms for another 3 miles (4.8 km) before it veered to the north. The tornado then traveled across SH-152, about 5 miles (8.0 km) west of Cordell, and headed northeast. It continued for 1 mile (1.6 km) after that, demolishing all the buildings on a farm before dissipating.

The tornado was on the ground for at least 18 minutes, traveled 7.2 miles (11.6 km), and was anywhere between 250 and 750 yards (230 and 690 m) wide. A total of 29 homes (including two trailer homes) were destroyed while 12 more homes received major damage and 13 others had minor damage while seven additional farm buildings were also destroyed. A total of 60 families were affected by the damage. A total of 35 vehicles were lost, trees were snapped, and 26 utility poles downed. Nine people were injured from the storm, although no serious injuries were reported, and losses totaled $250,000.

=== Randlett–Cookietown, Oklahoma ===
Randlett–Cookietown, Oklahoma
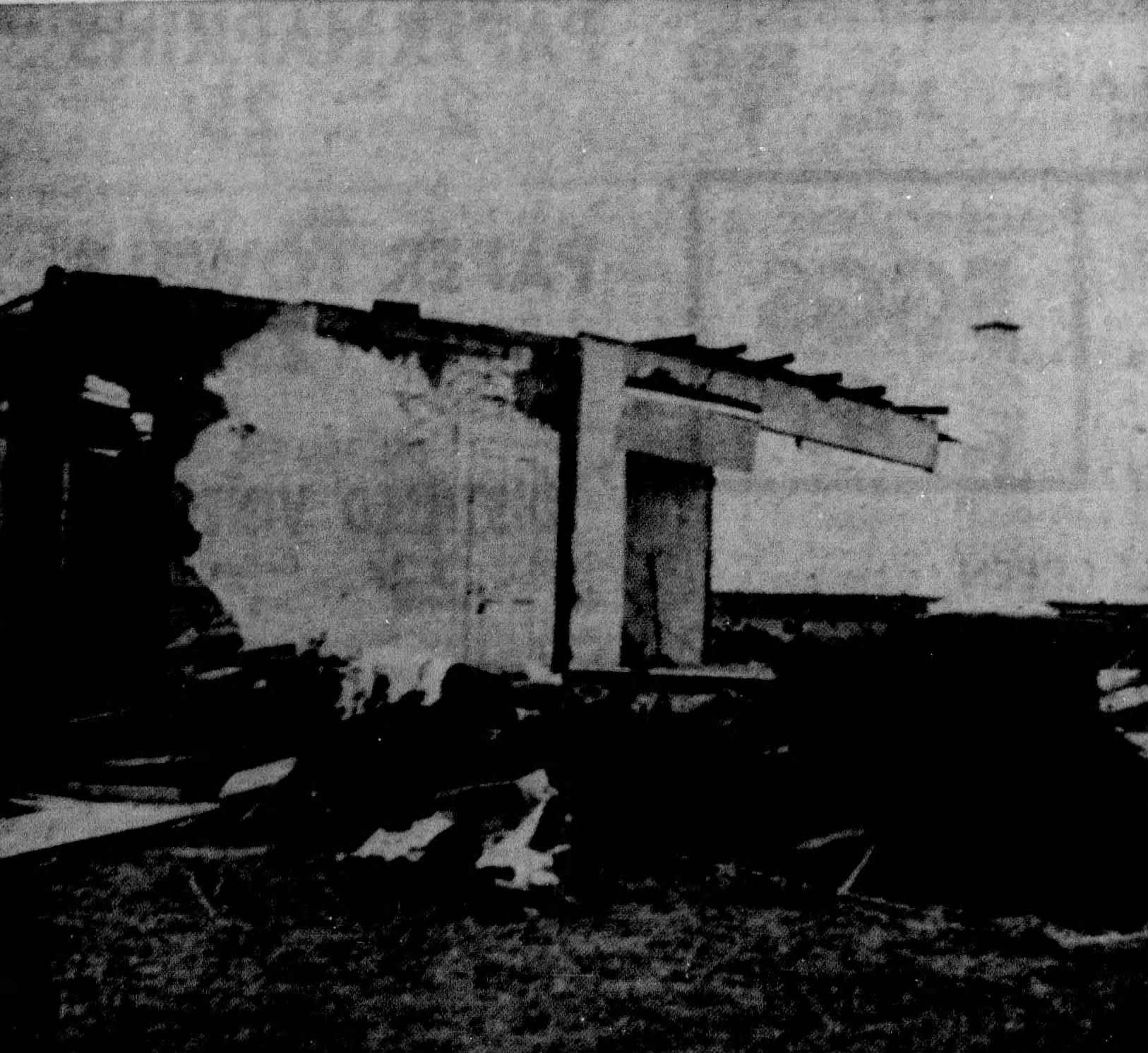
- The remains of a home near Randlett

F4 tornado
- on the Fujita scale

Overall effects
- Injuries: 1
- Damage: $250,000

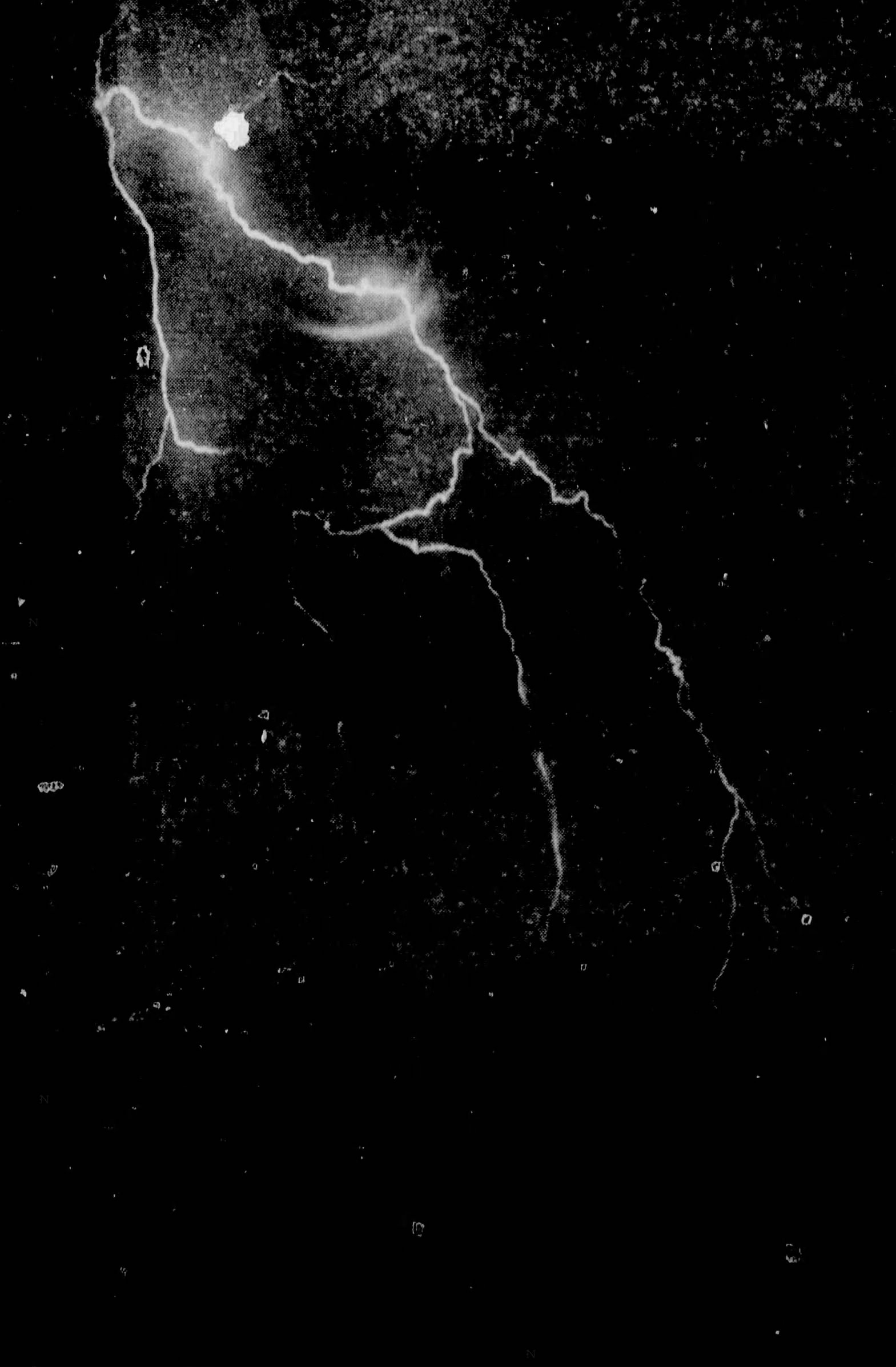
A photo of lightning formed from the parent supercell as the tornado was ongoing

On May 26, this large, violent F4 tornado first touched 4 miles (6.4 km) south of Randlett, where it heavily damaged a farmstead. It then bounced north-northeastward and struck another farm, leveling the home and the outbuildings, destroying a car, and even ripping the door clean off of the storm cellar where the family was taking shelter. After lifting briefly and streaming debris to the northeast, the tornado turned northeastward, damaging a home and destroying other buildings and machinery. A nearby cemetery had two-thirds of its grave headstones blown over. The tornado then crossed a local road, lifting and moving an unoccupied house over 100 yards (91 m) before placing it down completely intact in a pasture. The tornado then turned north, leveling buildings on three adjacent farms. An owner of one of the damaged farms sustained badly cut hands as he fought to hold the storm cellar door down against the tornado above him. His pickup truck, which was loaded with 65 bushels of wheat, was hurled 350 feet (110 m) and crushed. The storm continued on northeastward, damaging two more buildings, and destroying timber along West Cache Creek before lifting 4 miles (6.4 km) east of Cookietown.

The tornado traveled 10.1 miles (16.3 km) and was 400 yards (370 m) wide. In all, four farms were leveled while other were badly damaged, ten head of cattle were killed while others were injured, and some crop damage was reported. One person was injured and losses totaled $250,000.

=== Haskell, Texas tornadoes ===
Haskell, Texas tornadoes
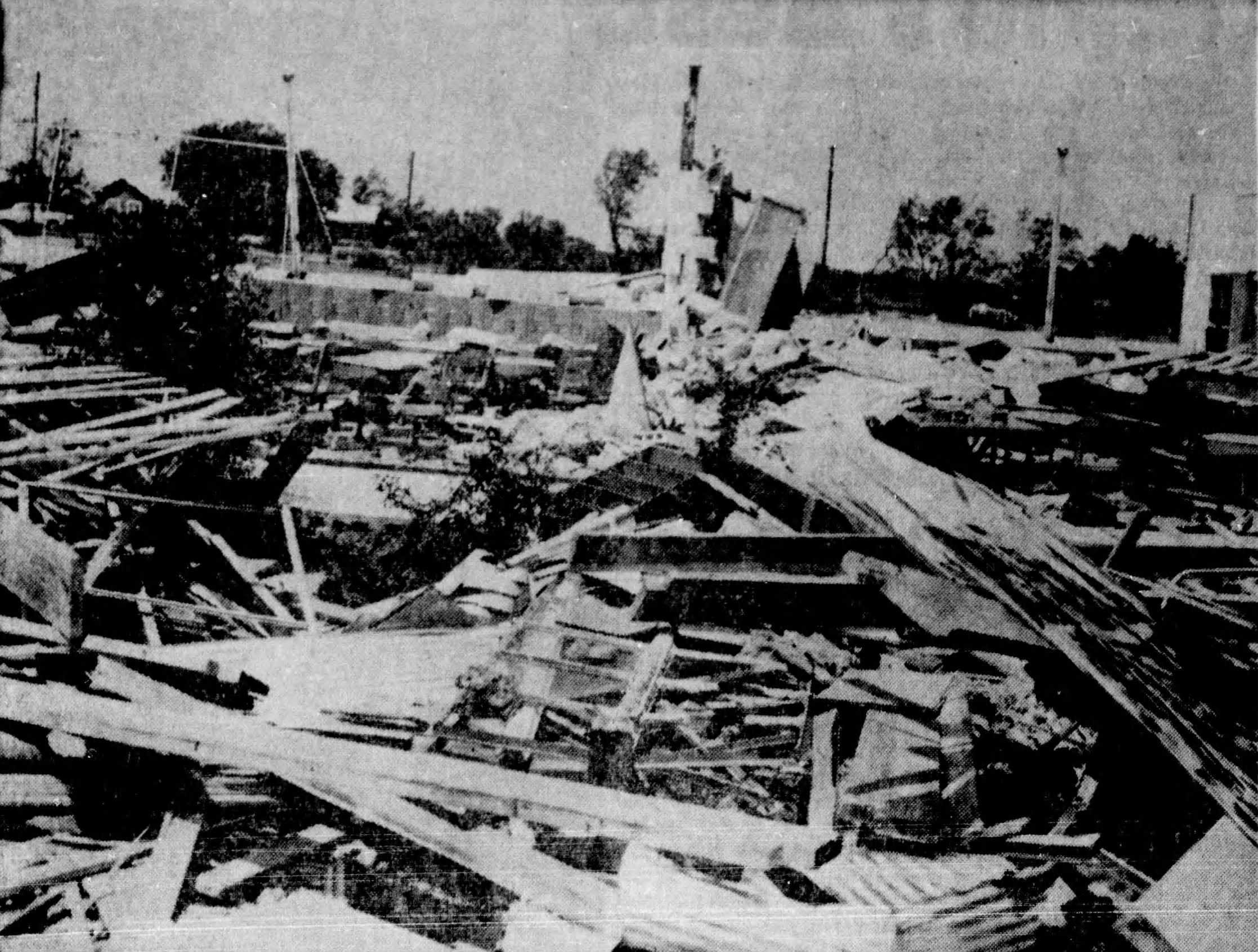
- The ruins of an elementary school wing that contained at least 8 classrooms in Haskell after the F4 tornado

Tornado outbreak
- Tornadoes: 3
- Max. rating: F4 tornado
- Largest hail: 4.5 inches (11 cm)

Overall effects
- Injuries: 1
- Damage: $2.5 million

Shortly after the F4 tornado above, a violent severe thunderstorm produced three tornadoes, which were followed by high winds and 1.75–4.25 in (4.4–10.8 cm) hail, that struck the town of Haskell, damaging almost every structure in town. The tornadoes were rated F4, F1, and F2 and they touched down southwest, west and northwest of town before moving eastward. Several businesses and numerous residences were obliterated with debris being scattered over 10 miles (16 km) to the east. In all, 95% of the homes in town sustained roof damage while 85% of them suffered window damage. The worst damage was to a large, steel-reinforced, concrete block elementary school building that were leveled and destroyed on its north and south side. 150 homes were damaged while 15 others were destroyed. Damages from the F4 tornado were estimated at $2.5 million, although the injury recorded may have actually been because of hail. Hailstones in the area were described as being as large as a saucer or softball as well with the largest measuring 4.5 inches (11 cm). Adequate warning allowed for a minimal number of casualties.

== Non-tornadic impacts ==
Throughout the period, there were 442 report of large hail and strong winds, including five reports of winds stronger than 80 knots (92 mph; 150 km/h) and nine reports of hail greater than 4 inches (10 cm) in diameter. The highest wind gust report came on May 24 when a 90 knots (100 mph; 170 km/h) gust was recorded at Will Rogers Field in Southwestern Oklahoma City, Oklahoma. The largest hail report came two days later southeast of Palco, Kansas, where a hailstone of 6 inches (15 cm) was observed. Widespread lightning and flooding damage occurred as well.

=== May 14 ===
Southern California was bombarded by two days of heavy rain, strong winds, hail, frequent lightning, snow and sleet to the region. There were four injuries across the region.

=== May 15 ===
Severe thunderstorms caused wind, hail, and lightning damage in the Western Piedmont of North Carolina with the Winston-Salem Airport recording a wind gust of 58 miles per hour (93 km/h). Winds blew down trees and caused some structural damage, hail damaged crops, and lightning injured a woman in her home in Chatham County while setting several homes and other buildings on fire.

=== May 16 ===
That afternoon, severe thunderstorms pushed through Huntsville, Alabama, with 1 inch (2.5 cm) hail covering the ground and lightning setting fire to a bakery. In the southern part of the state, a severe windstorm went through the heart of Mobile with winds reaching 90 miles per hour (140 km/h) with gusts to 100 miles per hour (160 km/h). Widespread damage occurred, a warehouse was destroyed, and one person was injured. In Georgia, a large area of severe thunderstorms bought heavy rain, damaging winds, large hail, and frequent lightning to the central and southern parts of the state that afternoon, damaging crops and roofs, blowing down power lines, and uprooting trees. The worst storm struck the Augusta, where heavy rains damaged street, lightning struck several houses, and electrical and telephone services were disrupted. Two people were injured in the city; one from flying glass and the other from lightning. That evening in Duncansville, Pennsylvania, a father and son were killed when the tree they were standing under was struck by lightning. Further to the west, a man was burned and left unconscious after lightning struck his Saint Edward, Nebraska home while he was on the telephone. The South Plains of Texas were also bombarded by hail and wind storms. 3.72 inches (94 mm) of rain fell in Plainview with 2.20 inches (56 mm) falling in one hour, although no serious flooding took place. Four people were injured near Roberston after wind blew over their farm house. A shed was also blown over by 70 miles per hour (110 km/h) in Littlefield and hail damaged farm fields across the region. That evening near Clarendon, a downpour of 6 inches (15 cm) of rain fell in just 45 minutes, triggering a flash flood. A 6 feet (1.8 m) wall of water smashed over a highway, sweeping away a pickup truck and carrying it 100 feet (30 m). The elderly brother and sister inside the vehicle drowned with one of the bodies being found 5 miles (8.0 km) downstream.

=== May 17 ===
A severe thunderstorm moved through Jonesboro, Arkansas, bringing wind damage, 1 inch (2.5 cm) hail, and heavy rain to the area. One man was also killed when he was struck by lightning. In Stoddard County, Missouri, lightning strikes killed a farmer driving a tractor and a lady in her front yard.

=== May 18 ===
In North Carolina, lightning injured four men on a golf course in Buncombe County while also burning a house in Caswell County. Near McMinnville, Tennessee, two men were struck by lightning while using a garden tractor to spray peach trees, killing one and injuring the other. In Iowa, lightning killed four more people in Manning, Woden, Iowa City, and Tiffin. In Scott County, Missouri, there was wind damage to homes and farm buildings and a home was burned to the ground after being struck by lightning. Widespread severe thunderstorms and frequent lightning also caused major damage in central and south-central Minnesota. A man was injured by flying glass in the Minneapolis suburb of St. Louis Park, lightning destroyed a barn and killed livestock in Janesville, and 3 in (7.6 cm) was recorded in and around St. Cloud. Storms in Sullivan County, New Hampshire caused major wind, lightning, and hail damage as well.

=== May 19 ===
Widespread strong to severe thunderstorms impacted the state of Massachusetts, bringing damaging winds, heavy rain, large hail, frequent lightning and flooding. Damage was widespread, with numerous homes, farm buildings, roadways, driveways, signs, TV antennas, and cellars and other structures damaged or destroyed by wind, falling trees, flooding rains and fire. On the Quabbin Reservation, one person a man was killed and his companion was injured when the tree they were sheltering under was struck by lightning. Two women were also injured by lightning in Hubbardston. Lightning also caused widespread damage occurred in Lower Michigan, damaging homes, destroying a barn, and causing power outages by striking power lines. A lady and her son were injured after lightning struck their home. Storms in Sullivan County, New Hampshire caused major wind, lightning, and hail damage for the second straight day. Severe thunderstorms also impacted New York and a boy was killed by lightning in Schroon Lake. In Virginia, a man was killed by lightning in Roanoke County while a church in Somerset was also hit by lightning, sparking a fire that burned the structure.

=== May 20 ===
Lightning strikes in Florida injured a person on a fishing pier in Atlantic Beach, killed cattle, and destroyed a home due to a fire. Severe thunderstorms also formed in Western North Texas before impacting the western and central parts of Oklahoma. Strong winds overturned two trailers and caused heavy sand damage to cars in Coachella Valley in California. Multiple hailstorms caused major damage in Sullivan County, New Hampshire. Hail was up to 1.25 inches (3.2 cm) in diameter in West Lebanon while news outlets described hail as big as "snowballs".

=== May 21 ===
Strong winds blew a tree down onto a trailer home in Grass Valley, California, killing one and injuring three. Large hail and lightning damaged gardens, dented parked cars, and burned a barn to the ground in Seymour, Indiana. Later, multiple severe thunderstorms moved through Indianapolis, Indiana, causing minor property while frequent lightning from the storms also injured three. Meanwhile, in Sanford, Florida, a fisherman was killed on the St. Johns River due to lightning while high winds damaged an aircraft moored at the Leesburg Regional Airport in Leesburg. In Iowa, lightning injured one in Inwood while a windstorm injured two in Sheldon. A man working on a ranch in Twodot, Minnesota was injured when he was struck by lightning. A woman was also injured after touching a lightning-charged switch in Croydon, New Hampshire.

=== May 22 ===
In Carroll County, Missouri, thunderstorms caused wind damage to farm buildings, homes, and a trailer home with the trailer being blown over, injuring a woman and her two children. In Iowa, lightning injured two in New Hampton while windstorms injured one in Chickasaw County and another in Clear Lake. Widespread severe thunderstorms affected Minnesota, bringing up to 75 miles per hour (121 km/h) winds, 3/4 inch (1.9 cm) hail, and 1.04 inches (26 mm) rain in 15 minutes. These storms congealed into two squall lines that struck West Central Wisconsin, causing extensive wind damage and injuring one.

=== May 23 ===
Four lightning fatalities took place on this day: One occurred in Jacksonville, Florida when a boy was struck and killed while fishing on a dock. The same complex of storms that produced the F1 tornado in Aurora, Ohio that day also caused a fatality when a man was struck by lightning in Wapakoneta, Ohio. Another lightning death occurred in Springfield, Georgia when a railroad bridge foreman was struck and one final one took place in Bourbon County, Kentucky when a tenant farmer tending to a tobacco field was hit. Central Kentucky also saw damage from 1.75–2 inches (4.4–5.1 cm) diameter hail. Multiple hailstorms also impacted Eastern Oklahoma, although little to no damage took place or no casualties were reported. High winds, hail, and lightning also affected Southern Lower Michigan. 1 inch (2.5 cm) hail was observed in Flint, 2.5 in (6.4 cm) hail was observed in Detroit, and a new home under construction was destroyed by high winds in Ypsilanti.

=== May 24 ===
A fierce line of severe thunderstorms pushed through Southwestern Oklahoma's wheat belt eastward through Southern Oklahoma, causing widespread destruction to crops, buildings, and utilities mostly due to flooding, hail, and strong straight-line winds, although there was some tornado activity. The worst damage occurred in Altus and the nearby Altus Air Force Base, where, in addition to the tornadoes that touched down, the storms produced 1.5 inches (3.8 cm) hail that reached up to 4 inches (10 cm) in diameter as well as wind gusts up to 85 miles per hour (137 km/h). The winds knocked down 72 power poles north of the city, ripped the roof of a house, destroyed a new house under construction, flipped over 15 trailers while demolishing another, damaged seven homes while pushing them off their foundations, double bent a transmitter tower on the west edge of town, destroyed two light planes and heavily damaged a third at the Altus Municipal Airport, and overturned three cars. A total of 25 people were injured by flying debris with six of them requiring hospitalization. Another injury also occurred as a result of a lightning strike. Total damages from the storms were estimated to be at least $2 million. Gusty winds behind the storms bought localized wind damage and gusts as high as 99 miles per hour (159 km/h). Severe and tornadic thunderstorms also impacted mainly Eastern Kansas, where at least 23 funnel clouds were confirmed along with numerous reports of wind and hail damage. Unusually severe weather also impacted New York and a farmer in Chittenango was killed by lightning.

=== May 25 ===
Kentucky state police reported golf-ball sized hail in Upton, Kentucky. A third consecutive severe weather outbreak impacted parts of Oklahoma bringing all types of severe weather impacts to all areas of the state except the panhandle, causing widespread damage, although no casualties took place. Near Bernie, Missouri, a man driving a tractor was killed when he was struck by lightning. Severe thunderstorms also brought wind and hail damage to Western North Carolina with a 68 miles per hour (109 km/h) wind gust being recorded at the Winston-Salem Airport. A boy was injured by a falling tree.

=== May 26 ===
A squall line pushed through Central and Northeastern Kentucky, producing large hail and locally damaging winds along the way. One person was killed while he struck by lightning while fishing in Maysville. Two others were injured by lightning; one on a golf course in Frankfort and the other in their home yard in Worthington. A hailstorm battered Boulder, Colorado, causing $100,000 in damage to roofs with additional damage to signs and windows. In Oklahoma, widespread severe thunderstorms formed for the fourth straight day, bringing large hail up to 4.5 inches (11 cm), damaging winds up to 84 miles per hour (135 km/h), heavy rainfall of up to 2.5 inches (64 mm), flooding, funnel clouds, and frequent lighting that affected all, but the panhandle and the northwestern parts of the state. Vehicles, buildings, homes, roads, and other structures were damaged, destroyed, burned, and/or washed out. A man was killed in Hobart when he was struck by lightning in his backyard while a person a mere 3 feet (0.91 m) away from him was left unharmed.

=== May 27 ===
A hailstorm struck Orlando, Florida with hailstones reaching up to 1.5 inches (3.8 cm) in diameter. In Northeastern Kansas, severe winds and hail caused damage in multiple towns and one person was injured. There were also some possible tornado activity, although no tornadoes were counted from the area that day. A hailstorm also bought 6–7 in (15–18 cm) hailstones to Logan County, Kansas, damaging crops, cars, roofs, and livestock.

=== May 28 ===
In Iowa, a person was injured by lightning in Pierson while another was killed after driving into a bridge washout in Fairfax. The entire state of Oklahoma, excluding the panhandle, was also subjected to another severe weather outbreak just two days after the previous one. Four soldiers at the Fort Sill rifle range were injured by lightning.

=== May 29 ===
In Tennessee, a boy in Hickory Cove and a young man in Knoxville were both hospitalized after being struck by lightning. Heavy damage occurred in Northeastern Arkansas when severe thunderstorms bought rain, wind, and hail to the area, injuring five. In a bizarre case in Southern Lower Michigan, a Detroit women was electrocuted by a lightning-charged steel fence, killing her. Lightning also caused a fire that destroyed a large business building in Downtown Monroe while lightning and windstorms caused more damage across the region as well.

=== May 30 ===
Lightning struck and killed a person on a beach in New Port Richey, Florida. A shower in Rose Hill, Kansas produced a lightning strike that injured a man and a woman who were opening the door to their car. In North Carolina, Buncombe, Burke, and Catawba Counties saw afternoon storms that produced frequent lightning, which caused scattered damage to power and communication lines. In Morganton, lightning struck a softball field, instantly killing a player. Several others were knocked down, but not injured.

=== May 31 ===
Eastern Logan County, Colorado was heavily damaged by heavy rain and large hail. Hail mowed down wheat fields while rain flooded roads and even drowned livestock. Some structural damage to buildings also occurred. Statewide severe thunderstorms bought wind, hail, heavy rain, and frequent lightning to Massachusetts. Multiple communities sustained heavy damage from lightning-induced fires, street flooding and washouts, and loss of power and communications. A man reportedly died in one of the fires, although it was not officially counted. Downed trees, tree limbs, and power lines and wires littered this state, including one instance where a tree limb injured a girl in North Cambridge when she became pinned underneath it. In North Carolina, severe storms struck Buncombe, Durham, Gaston, and Wake Counties. Lightning-set fires destroyed one home and damaged several others while strong winds and rain damaged tobacco crops.

== Aftermath ==
Following the Pecos, Texas F2 tornado, power outages lasted for about an hour due to downed power lines.

In the aftermath of the Mitchell, South Dakota F3 tornado, volunteers from other cities, counties and the state sent crews in to assist in the clean-up. When the effort waned due to the massive size of debris left behind, Mitchell Mayor Charles "C.W." Klingaman had to urge people to get back to work and finish the job. The flattened businesses, including the Mitchell Boat Company, which was just a year old, was rebuilt and a state highway maintenance shop was replaced. The city reported over $2 million in new construction during 1962.

There were numerous downed power lines in the aftermath of the Iowa City, Iowa F2 tornado. Police and firefighters spent an hour and a half keeping people away from the hot wires.

Many people in Waterbury were caught off guard by the high-end F3 tornado in Waterbury, Connecticut, despite a tornado warning being issued for the city, which saw 1.5 inches (3.8 cm) hail fall before the tornado moved through. Off-duty police and firefighters were called in, as were the National Guard and the Red Cross. In a surprising move President John F. Kennedy expressed his concern, but never declared Waterbury a federal disaster area. Despite this, rebuilding started within days of the storm. In nearby Wolcott, the destruction of a utility pole caused the utility company to shut off power to the rest of the town to prevent fires. Connecticut Governor John S. Dempsey conferred with town officials and Police Chief George Ranslow to check on the situation in the town the evening of the tornado. Town officials told the Governor that the situation was under control and they would call him if they needed help. The next morning, Superintendent of Schools, Augustus Keane, cancelled school at Wolcott High School due to lack of power; but all the elementary schools remained open.

== See also ==
- List of North American tornadoes and tornado outbreaks
  - List of F4 and EF4 tornadoes
- 1980 Grand Island tornado outbreak
- Tornado outbreak sequence of May 2019
