= Frank Eddy =

American politician (1856–1929)

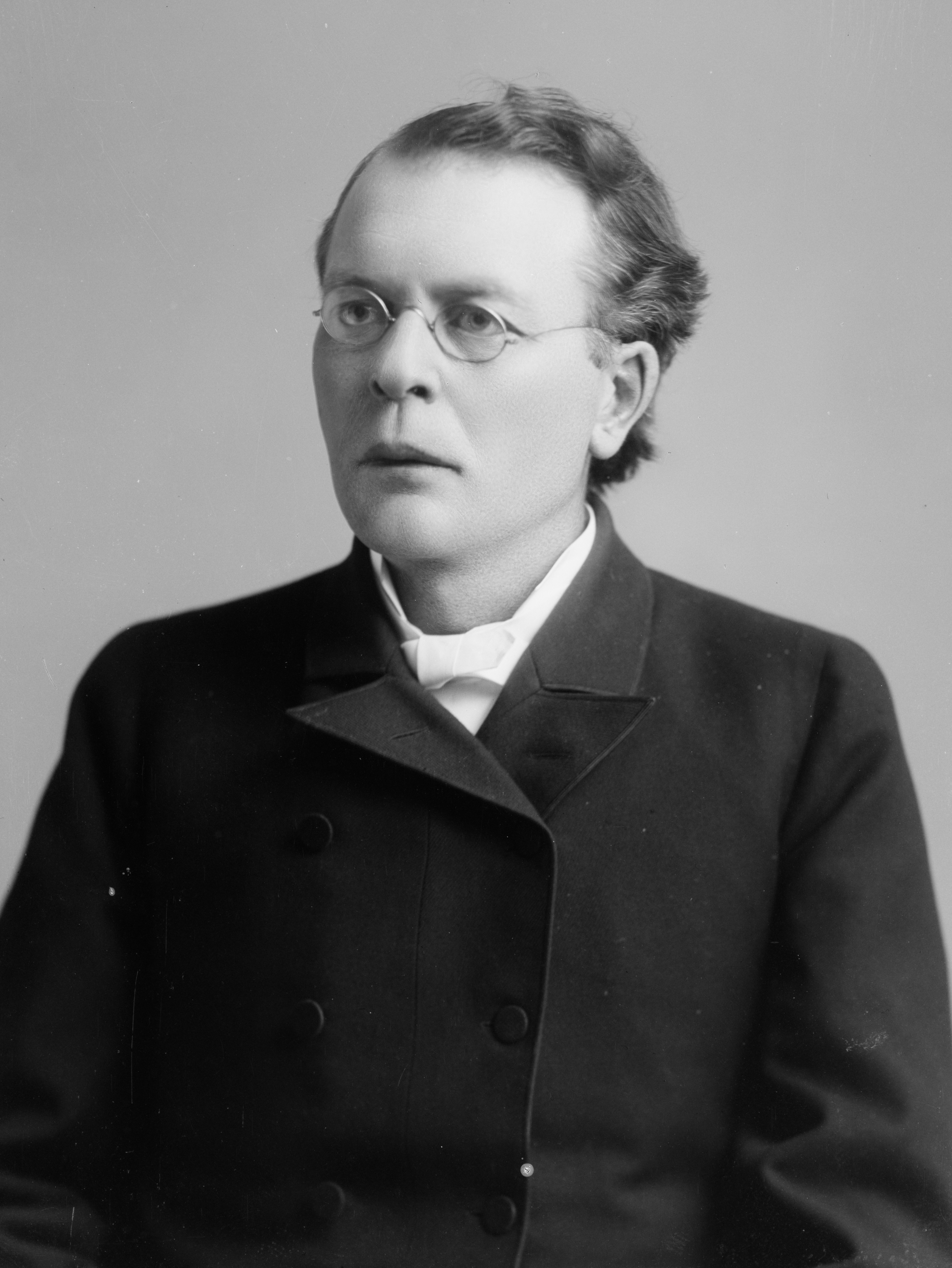
- Eddy c. 1894 – c. 1901

Member of the U.S. House of Representatives from Minnesota's 7th district
- In office March 4, 1895 – March 3, 1903
- Preceded by: Haldor Boen
- Succeeded by: Andrew Volstead

Personal details
- Born: April 1, 1856 Pleasant Grove Township, Minnesota Territory, U.S.
- Died: January 13, 1929 (aged 72) Saint Paul, Minnesota, U.S.
- Party: Republican

Frank Marion Eddy (April 1, 1856 – January 13, 1929) was a United States representative from Minnesota's 7th congressional district. Eddy was born in Pleasant Grove Township, Minnesota, before moving to Iowa in 1860 with his family. They returned in 1863 to Olmsted County, Minnesota, and settled near Elmira. In 1867, they moved to Sauk Centre, Minnesota, where Eddy attended the common schools.

Eddy taught school in a rural district before joining the Northern Pacific Railroad Company as a land examiner in 1881 and 1882. He then moved to Glenwood, Minnesota, and served as clerk of the district court of Pope County from 1884 to 1893.

In 1894, Eddy was elected as the first United States Representative from Minnesota who was a native of the state. He was elected as a Republican to the 54th, 55th, 56th, and 57th congresses, March 4, 1895, until March 3, 1903. While a congressman, Eddy served as chairman of the Committee on Mines and Mining in the 57th congress. He declined to be a candidate for renomination in 1902. In 1904, he ran for governor of Minnesota, but was defeated in the primary.

After his terms in Congress, Eddy became editor and owner of the Sauk Centre Herald. He died on January 13, 1929, in Saint Paul, Minnesota, and was interred in Greenwood Cemetery in Sauk Centre.

U.S. House of Representatives
Preceded by Haldor Boen	U.S. Representative from Minnesota's 7th congressional district 1895–1903	Succeeded by Andrew Volstead
