= Simpson, Minnesota =

Simpson
- Unincorporated community
- Location within Minnesota Location within the United States
- Coordinates: 43°55′26″N 92°24′36″W
- Country: United States
- State: Minnesota
- County: Olmsted
- Township: Pleasant Grove Township
- Elevation: 1,270 ft (390 m)
- Time zone: UTC-6 (Central (CST))
  - Summer (DST): UTC-5 (CDT)
- ZIP code: 55904
- Area code: 507
- GNIS feature ID: 652079

Simpson is an unincorporated community in Pleasant Grove Township, Olmsted County, Minnesota, United States, near Rochester and Stewartville. The community is located along Olmsted County Road 1 (Simpson Road) near County Road 16 and 68th Street SE. Whitney Creek flows nearby.

== History ==
Simpson was platted in 1890, and named for Thomas Simpson, a railroad official. A post office was established at Simpson in 1890, and remained in operation until 1956.
