= Haldor Boen =

American politician

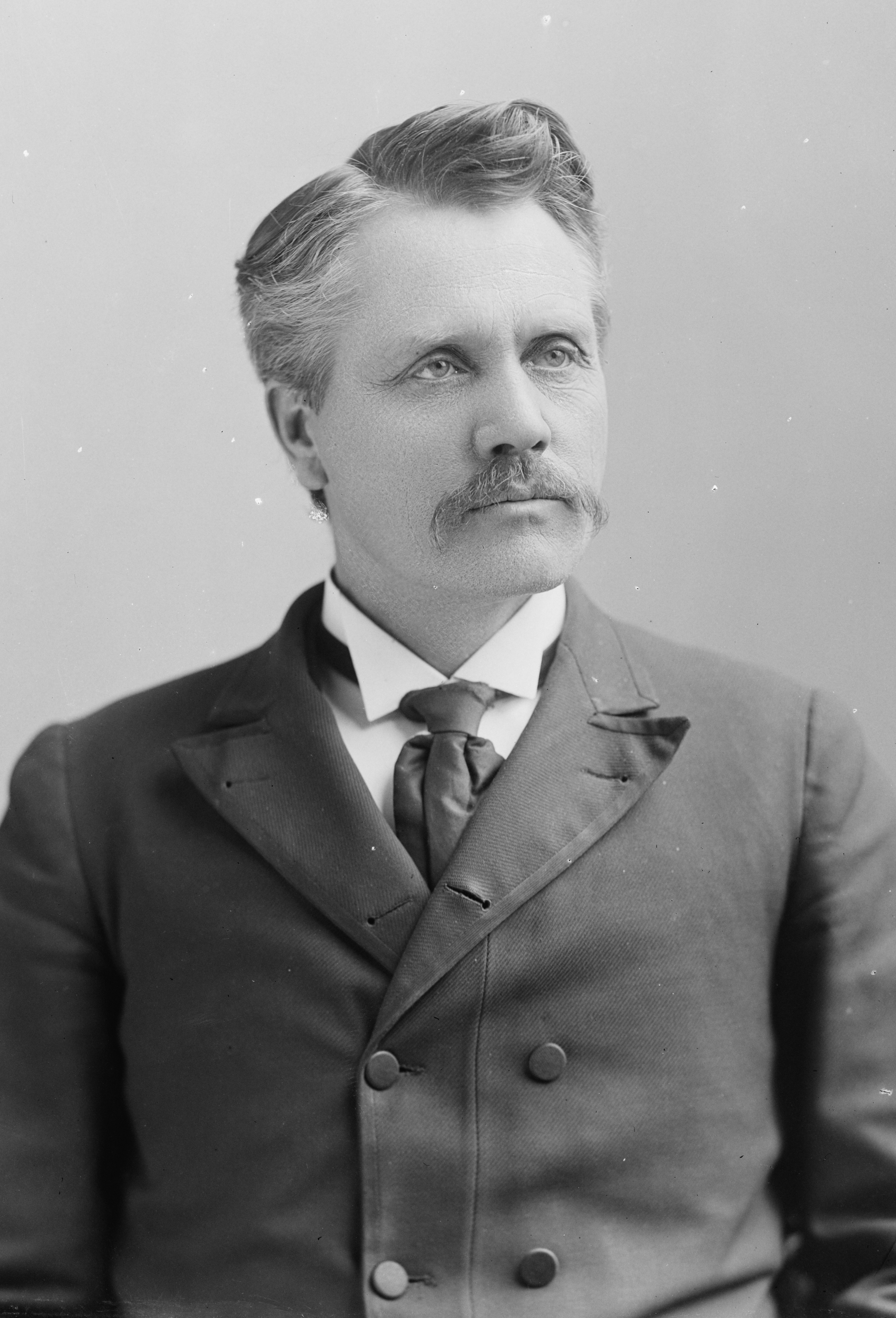
- Portrait by C. M. Bell c. 1894–1895

Member of the U.S. House of Representatives from Minnesota's 7th district
- In office March 4, 1893 – March 3, 1895
- Preceded by: District created
- Succeeded by: Frank Eddy

Personal details
- Born: January 1, 1851 Sør-Aurdal, Valdres
- Died: July 20, 1912 (aged 61)
- Party: Populist
- Other political affiliations: Socialist (1906)
- Education: St. Cloud Normal School
- Occupation: Educator

Haldor Erickson Boen (January 1, 1851 – July 20, 1912) was an American congressman from Minnesota.

== Biography ==
Boen was born in Sør-Aurdal Municipality in Valdres, a traditional district in Christians amt (county), Norway. He immigrated to the United States in 1868 and settled in Mower County, Minnesota. He attended the St. Cloud Normal School in 1869 and 1870. Boen relocated to Fergus Falls in Otter Tail County in 1871. In 1872, he was employed in the county auditor's office, computing the first taxes levied in Otter Tail County. He taught in public schools of that county from 1874 to 1879. Boen acted as justice of the peace from 1875 to 1900. In 1880, he was elected county commissioner and was a register of deeds from 1888 to 1892.

In November 1892, Boen was elected as a Populist to the 53rd congress, representing the newly created 7th congressional district from March 4, 1893, to March 3, 1895. He was unsuccessful in his re-election bid in 1894. Boen then became editor of the Fergus Falls Globe and resumed agricultural pursuits in Otter Tail County. He was again a candidate for Congress in 1900 as a member of the Referendum Party and in 1906 as a Socialist.

He died in Aurdal Township in Otter Tail County and was interred in Aurdal Cemetery near Fergus Falls, Minnesota.

== Other sources ==
- Minnesota Historical Society. Guide to Research Collections
- United States Congress. "Haldor Boen (id: B000590)". Biographical Directory of the United States Congress.

U.S. House of Representatives
New district	U.S. Representative from Minnesota's 7th congressional district 1893–1895	Succeeded by Frank Eddy
