= Waterville (Waterbury) =

Coordinates: 41.5899°N 73.0514°W

Waterville is a neighborhood of the city of Waterbury, Connecticut. It was formerly known as Pine Hole and Haydensville. It has been home to industrial and manufacturing facilities from the 1960s onward. The ethnic makeup of Waterville consists of Italian, Irish, French and Latin American. This section of Waterbury contains two parks and the main office of the city's Department of Transportation.

== Population ==
Waterville makes up 25,220 of Waterbury's 110,189 population. Of that number, 11,445 are male and 13,765 are female. Waterville has 9,528 households with an average household income of $45,983.

Waterville is 290 feet (88 m) above sea level and lies in the Eastern Time Zone (EST/EDT), observing daylight saving time. In addition, Waterville is located two miles (3.2 km) to the north of downtown Waterbury, three miles (4.8 km) to the east southeast of Watertown, four miles (6.4 km) to the west of Wolcott, five miles (8 km) to the northeast of Middlebury, five miles (8 km) to the south southwest of Plymouth, five miles (8 km) to the south southeast of Thomaston, and 22 miles (35 km) to the west southwest of Hartford.

== 1962 tornado ==
On May 24, 1962, the area was heavily damaged by a high-end F3 tornado. Part of the residential area and the most of industrial area was completely destroyed, half of the Waterville Bible Church was destroyed, the roof of the Sprague School gym was blown off, and a lumber company and a corrugated cardboard manufacturer were obliterated with pieces of the buildings being tossed into the Naugatuck River. Overall the storm, left one dead and 50 injured.

== Notable people ==
- Johnny Moore, (1902–1991) was an outfielder in Major League Baseball for the Chicago Cubs.
