= Pleasant Grove, Minnesota =

Pleasant Grove
- Unincorporated community
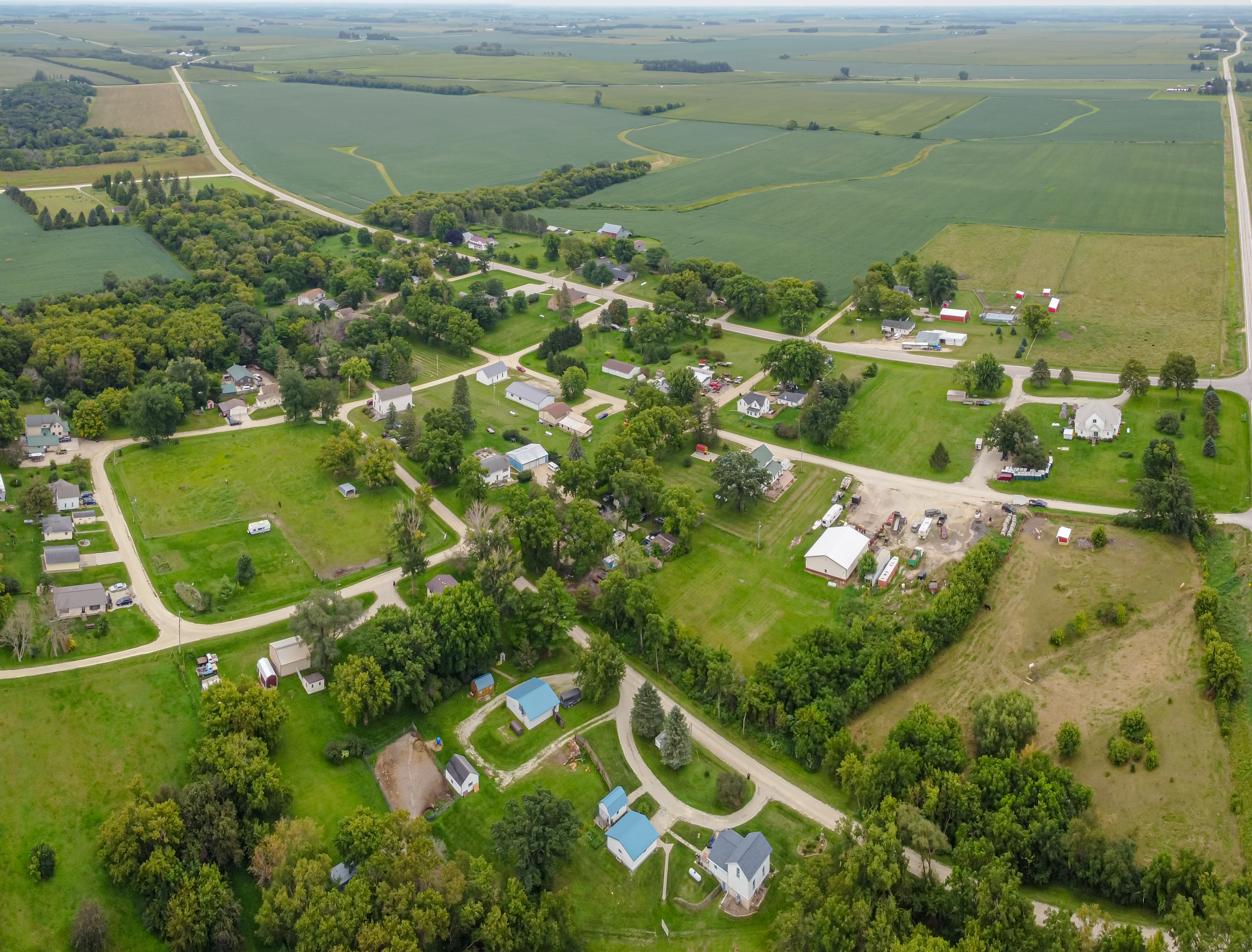

- Location within Minnesota Location within the United States
- Coordinates: 43°52′09″N 92°23′09″W
- Country: United States
- State: Minnesota
- County: Olmsted
- Township: Pleasant Grove Township
- Elevation: 1,289 ft (393 m)
- Time zone: UTC-6 (Central (CST))
  - Summer (DST): UTC-5 (CDT)
- ZIP code: 55976
- Area code: 507
- GNIS feature ID: 649549

Pleasant Grove is an unincorporated community in Pleasant Grove Township, Olmsted County, Minnesota, United States, near Rochester and Stewartville. The community is located along Olmsted County Road 1 near County Road 140.

== History ==
Pleasant Grove was platted in 1854, and named for a grove of oak trees near the original town site. A post office was established at Pleasant Grove in 1854, and remained in operation until 1905.

== Notable person ==
- Augustus Barrows (1838–1885), lumberman and legislator

Historical population
| Census | Pop. | Note | %± |
|---|---|---|---|
| 1880 | 200 | | — |
U.S. Decennial Census
