= Mills, Nebraska =

Unincorporated community in Nebraska, United States

- Unincorporated community
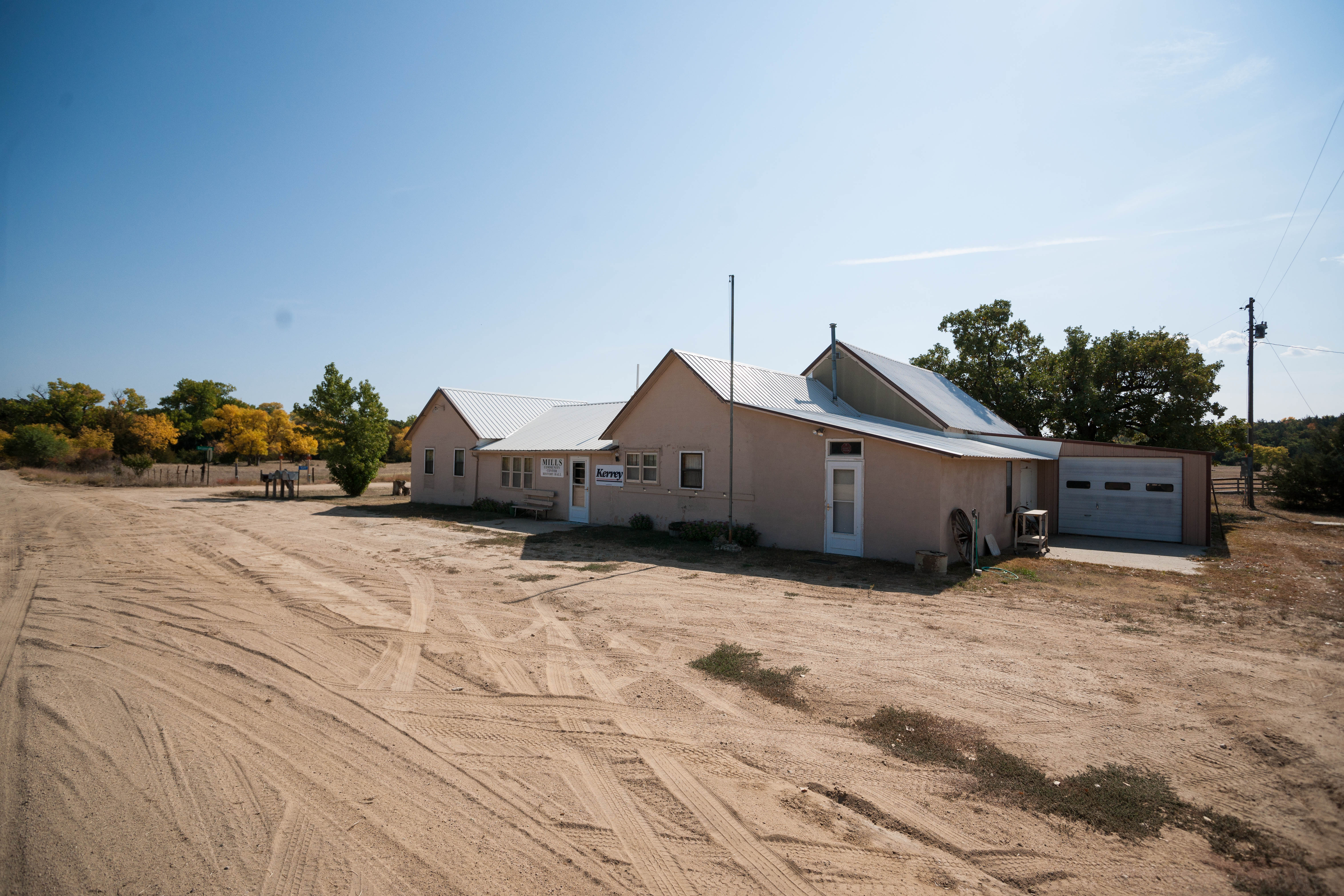
- Community Center in Mills

- Location within Nebraska Location within the United States
- Coordinates: 42°56′26″N 99°26′38″W
- Country: United States
- State: Nebraska
- County: Keya Paha
- Elevation: 1,919 ft (585 m)
- Time zone: UTC-6 (Central (CST))
  - Summer (DST): UTC-5 (CDT)
- ZIP codes: 68753
- GNIS feature ID: 831330

Mills is an unincorporated community in northeastern Keya Paha County, Nebraska, United States. It lies along local roads northeast of the village of Springview, the county seat of Keya Paha County. Its elevation is 1,919 feet (585 m). It has a post office with the ZIP code of 68753; the ZCTA for ZIP code 68753 had a population of 106 at the 2000 census.

== History ==
Mills is named for a gristmill in the location. The Mills post office was established in the 1880s.
