= Radium, Texas =

- Unincorporated community
- Location within Texas Location within the United States
- Coordinates: 32°49′45″N 99°59′43″W
- Country: United States
- State: Texas
- County: Jones
- Elevation: 1,703 ft (519 m)
- Time zone: UTC-6 (Central (CST))
  - Summer (DST): UTC-5 (CDT)
- GNIS feature ID: 1378925

Radium is an unincorporated community in Jones County, Texas, United States.
