= Pleasant Grove Township, Olmsted County, Minnesota =

Pleasant Grove Township, Minnesota
- Township
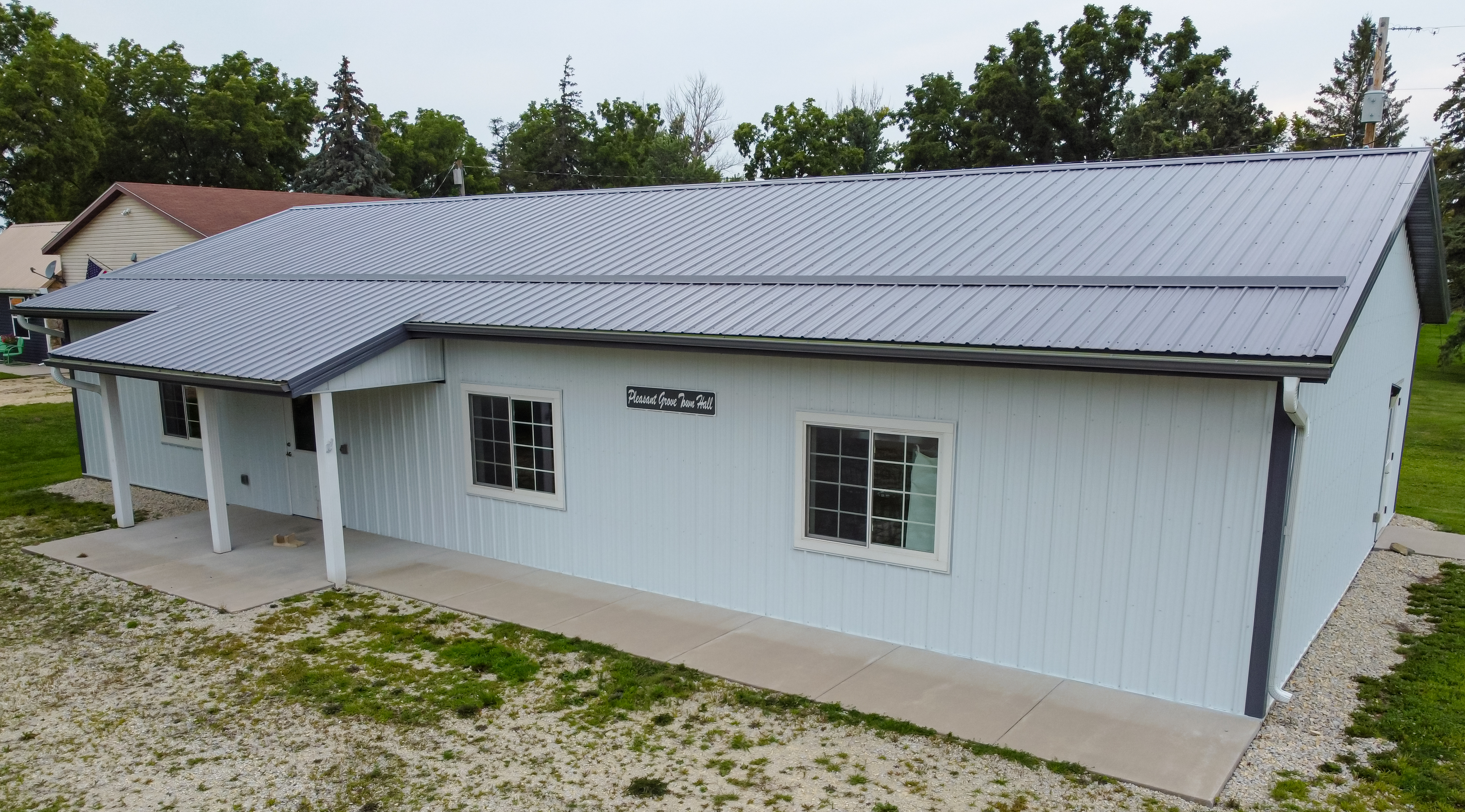
- Town hall in Pleasant Grove

- Location within the state of Minnesota Pleasant Grove Township, Minnesota (the United States)
- Coordinates: 43°53′54″N 92°22′38″W
- Country: United States
- State: Minnesota
- County: Olmsted

Area
  - Total: 35.8 sq mi (92.6 km^{2})
  - Land: 35.8 sq mi (92.6 km^{2})
  - Water: 0 sq mi (0.0 km^{2})
- Elevation: 1,168 ft (356 m)

Population (2000)
  - Total: 787
  - Density: 22/sq mi (8.5/km^{2})
- Time zone: UTC-6 (Central (CST))
  - Summer (DST): UTC-5 (CDT)
- ZIP code: 55976
- Area code: 507
- FIPS code: 27-51550
- GNIS feature ID: 0665319

Pleasant Grove Township is a township in Olmsted County, Minnesota, United States. The population was 787 at the 2000 census.

Pleasant Grove Township was organized in 1858.

== Geography ==
According to the United States Census Bureau, the township has a total area of 35.7 square miles (92.6 km^{2}), all land. Unincorporated communities within the township include Pleasant Grove.

== Demographics ==
As of the census of 2000, there were 787 people, 305 households, and 240 families residing in the township. The population density was 22.0 people per square mile (8.5/km^{2}). There were 316 housing units at an average density of 8.8/sq mi (3.4/km^{2}). The racial makeup of the township was 99.36% White, 0.25% African American, and 0.38% from two or more races. Hispanic or Latino of any race were 0.51% of the population.

There were 305 households, out of which 32.8% had children under the age of 18 living with them, 68.9% were married couples living together, 6.2% had a female householder with no husband present, and 21.3% were non-families. 16.7% of all households were made up of individuals, and 5.9% had someone living alone who was 65 years of age or older. The average household size was 2.58 and the average family size was 2.89.

In the township the population was spread out, with 24.7% under the age of 18, 5.1% from 18 to 24, 25.5% from 25 to 44, 31.1% from 45 to 64, and 13.6% who were 65 years of age or older. The median age was 42 years. For every 100 females, there were 107.7 males. For every 100 females age 18 and over, there were 103.1 males.

The median income for a household in the township was $52,054, and the median income for a family was $60,625. Males had a median income of $39,643 versus $30,417 for females. The per capita income for the township was $24,822. About 1.6% of families and 2.7% of the population were below the poverty line, including 4.8% of those under age 18 and 2.8% of those age 65 or over.
