= National Register of Historic Places listings in Cass County, Nebraska =

Location of Cass County in Nebraska

Cass County, Nebraska, United States, has 33 properties and districts listed on the National Register of Historic Places, including one National Historic Landmark.

The locations of National Register properties and districts for which the latitude and longitude coordinates are included below may be seen in a map.

This National Park Service list is complete through NPS recent listings posted October 30, 2026.

== Current listings ==
	Name on the Register	Image	Date listed	Location	City or town	Description
1	Agricultural Society Building (Auditorium)	Agricultural Society Building (Auditorium)	March 3, 2023 (#100008673)	101 West Eldora Ave. 40°52′12″N 96°08′25″W	Weeping Water	
2	Ashland Archeological Site		February 10, 1975 (#75001090)	Both sides of a small stream that meets Salt Creek immediately above its confluence with the Platte River; 41°01′54″N 96°18′59″W	Ashland	
3	Bridge	Bridge	June 29, 1992 (#92000707)	County road over an unnamed stream, 4.7 miles (7.6 km) southeast of Louisville; 40°58′22″N 96°04′55″W	Louisville	part of the Highway Bridges in Nebraska Multiple Property Submission (MPS)
4	Cass County Courthouse	Cass County Courthouse	January 10, 1990 (#89002248)	Main St. between 3rd and 4th Sts. 41°00′42″N 95°53′01″W	Plattsmouth	part of the County Courthouses of Nebraska MPS
5	Theodore Davis Site		May 19, 1972 (#72000743)	Address Restricted	Weeping Water	
6	George E. Dovey House	George E. Dovey House	November 5, 2018 (#100003091)	423 N 4th St. 41°00′54″N 95°53′02″W	Plattsmouth	
7	The Elms	The Elms	March 24, 1977 (#77000824)	204 East F Street; 40°50′39″N 96°17′31″W	Elmwood	Home of author Bess Streeter Aldrich.
8	Paul Fitzgerald House	Paul Fitzgerald House	March 2, 2006 (#06000100)	513 E. 2nd St. 41°00′05″N 96°09′23″W	Louisville	
9	Paul Gering House	Paul Gering House	July 12, 2006 (#06000604)	423 N. 6th St. 41°00′54″N 95°53′09″W	Plattsmouth	
10	Gibson House	Gibson House	March 20, 1986 (#86000471)	107 Clinton; 40°52′15″N 96°08′41″W	Weeping Water	
11	Walker Gilmore Site (22CC28)		October 15, 1966 (#66000441)	Northeastern quarter of the northeastern quarter of Section 28, Township 11 North, Range 14 East; 40°53′59″N 95°50′14″W	Murray	
12	James and Margaret Greer Farmstead	James and Margaret Greer Farmstead	March 21, 2011 (#11000103)	6315 202nd St. 40°53′18″N 96°26′49″W	Alvo	
13	Kehlbeck Farmstead	Kehlbeck Farmstead	September 26, 1985 (#85002577)	Address Restricted	Avoca	
14	Christian Kupke Farmstead	Christian Kupke Farmstead	December 19, 2012 (#12001073)	32618 Church Rd. 40°57′27″N 96°14′54″W	Murdock	Operated under name "The Farm at Long Lane, LLC"
15	Velosco V. Leonard House	Velosco V. Leonard House	November 5, 2018 (#100003092)	323 N 6th St. 41°00′51″N 95°53′10″W	Plattsmouth	
16	Manley School	Manley School	December 30, 2004 (#04001414)	115 Cherry St. 40°55′14″N 96°10′04″W	Manley	part of the School Buildings in Nebraska MPS
17	McLaughlin-Waugh-Dovey House	McLaughlin-Waugh-Dovey House	October 14, 1980 (#80002443)	414 B Ave. 41°00′49″N 95°53′05″W	Plattsmouth	
18	Memorial to the American Bandshell	Memorial to the American Bandshell	July 7, 2026 (#100012975)	Platte River Rest Area Eastbound, Interstate 80, MM 425.08; 41°00′05″N 96°19′06″W	Greenwood vicinity	
19	Morgan-Fricke House	Morgan-Fricke House	July 27, 2021 (#100006790)	623 North 6th St. 41°01′02″N 95°53′10″W	Plattsmouth	
20	Naomi Institute	Naomi Institute	March 24, 1977 (#77000825)	3 miles (4.8 km) east of Murray; 40°55′46″N 95°51′10″W	Murray	
21	Nehawka Flint Quarries		January 26, 1970 (#70000368)	Address Restricted	Nehawka	
22	Nehawka Public Library	Nehawka Public Library	December 5, 2002 (#02001481)	Southeast corner of Elm and Maple Streets. 40°49′45″N 95°59′19″W	Nehawka	
23	Capt. John O'Rourke House	Capt. John O'Rourke House	March 2, 2006 (#06000102)	424 N. 6th St. 41°00′54″N 95°53′11″W	Plattsmouth	
24	Glenn and Addie Perry Farmhouse	Glenn and Addie Perry Farmhouse	November 8, 2006 (#06000999)	Address Restricted	Plattsmouth	
25	Gottfried Gustav Pitz Barn	Gottfried Gustav Pitz Barn	August 27, 2012 (#12000564)	903 Livingston Rd. 41°00′07″N 95°52′30″W	Plattsmouth	
26	Plattsmouth Bridge	Plattsmouth Bridge	April 15, 1993 (#92000755)	U.S. Route 34 over the Missouri River; 41°00′03″N 95°52′01″W	Plattsmouth	Extends into Mills County, Iowa; part of the Highway Bridges in Nebraska MPS
27	Plattsmouth High School	Plattsmouth High School	March 13, 2020 (#100005052)	814 Main St. 41°00′41″N 95°53′24″W	Plattsmouth	Now the First Baptist School
28	Plattsmouth Main Street Historic District	Plattsmouth Main Street Historic District	September 26, 1985 (#85002585)	Main St. bounded by Avenue A, S. and N. 3rd St., 1st Ave. and S. and N. 7th St. 41°00′41″N 95°53′04″W	Plattsmouth	
29	Peter E. Ruffner House	Peter E. Ruffner House	March 22, 2016 (#16000105)	501 N. 8th St. 41°00′56″N 95°53′18″W	Plattsmouth	
30	Snoke Farmstead	Snoke Farmstead	March 5, 1998 (#98000189)	23416 O St., U.S. Highway 34; 40°48′50″N 96°23′42″W	Eagle	Farmstead from 1875.
31	Union Jail	Union Jail	July 12, 2006 (#06000605)	1st and Rock St. 40°48′44″N 95°55′23″W	Union	
32	Weeping Water Historic District	Weeping Water Historic District	December 8, 1972 (#72000744)	Randolph and H Sts. 40°52′16″N 96°08′32″W	Weeping Water	Consists of the 1870 Congregational Church, the Heritage House Museum, and the Jesse C. Fate Office.
33	Young Cemetery Cabin	Young Cemetery Cabin	December 30, 2004 (#04001408)	Young Ln. E400; 40°56′26″N 95°54′17″W	Plattsmouth	

== See also ==
- List of National Historic Landmarks in Nebraska
- National Register of Historic Places listings in Nebraska
