= Mynard =

Mynard may refer to:

- Les Mynard (1925–2008), English footballer
- Mynard, Nebraska, unincorporated community
- Mynard Road Bridge, in Nebraska
