= Senator Dooley =

Senator Dooley may refer to:

- Albert J. Dooley (1930–2022), South Carolina State Senate
- John Dooley (politician) (1883–1961), Senate of Australia
- Tom Dooley (Nebraska politician) (1880–1958), Nebraska State Senate
