= Gilmore House =

Gilmore House may refer to:

in the United States (by state then city)

- Gilmore House (Calais, Maine), listed on the National Register of Historic Places (NRHP) in Washington County
- Onslow Gilmore House, Stoneham, Massachusetts, listed on the NRHP in Middlesex County
- Gilmore-Patterson Farm, St. Paul's, North Carolina, listed on the NRHP in Bladen County
- Gilmore House (Holly Hill, South Carolina), formerly listed on the National Register of Historic Places in Orangeburg County, South Carolina
- Elizabeth Harden Gilmore House, Charleston, West Virginia, listed on the NRHP in Kanawha County
- Eugene A. Gilmore House, Madison, Wisconsin, a Frank Lloyd Wright-designed house, NRHP-listed in Dane County

== See also ==
- Walker Gilmore site, listed on the NRHP in Nebraska
