= Edwin McHugh =

American politician (1915–2004)

Member of the Nebraska Legislature from the 3rd district
- In office January 6, 1959 – January 1, 1963
- Preceded by: Tom Dooley
- Succeeded by: Dale Payne

Personal details
- Born: May 18, 1915 Murdock, Nebraska
- Died: December 3, 2004 (aged 89) Lincoln, Nebraska
- Party: Republican
- Spouse: Dorothy Smoke (m. 1942; died 1999)
- Children: 4
- Education: University of Nebraska (B.Sc., LL.B.)
- Occupation: Banker, attorney

Edwin T. McHugh (May 18, 1915 – December 3, 2004) was a Republican politician from Nebraska who served as a member of the Nebraska Legislature from the 3rd district from 1959 to 1963.

McHugh was born in Murdock, Nebraska, and attended the University of Nebraska, where he received his bachelor's degree and his bachelor of laws degree. He served in the U.S. military during World War II, and upon returning to Nebraska, founded the Corn Growers State Bank.

In 1952, McHugh ran for the Nebraska Legislature from the 3rd district, but narrowly lost to former State Senator Tom Dooley. He challenged Dooley in 1958, and initially placed third in the primary. However, when Dooley died on October 12, 1958, shortly before the election, McHugh was automatically placed on the ballot, and he won the general election with 54 percent of the vote. He was re-elected in 1960. McHugh declined to seek re-election in 1962.

McHugh died on December 3, 2004.
