= Louisville State Recreation Area =

Recreation area in Nebraska, United States

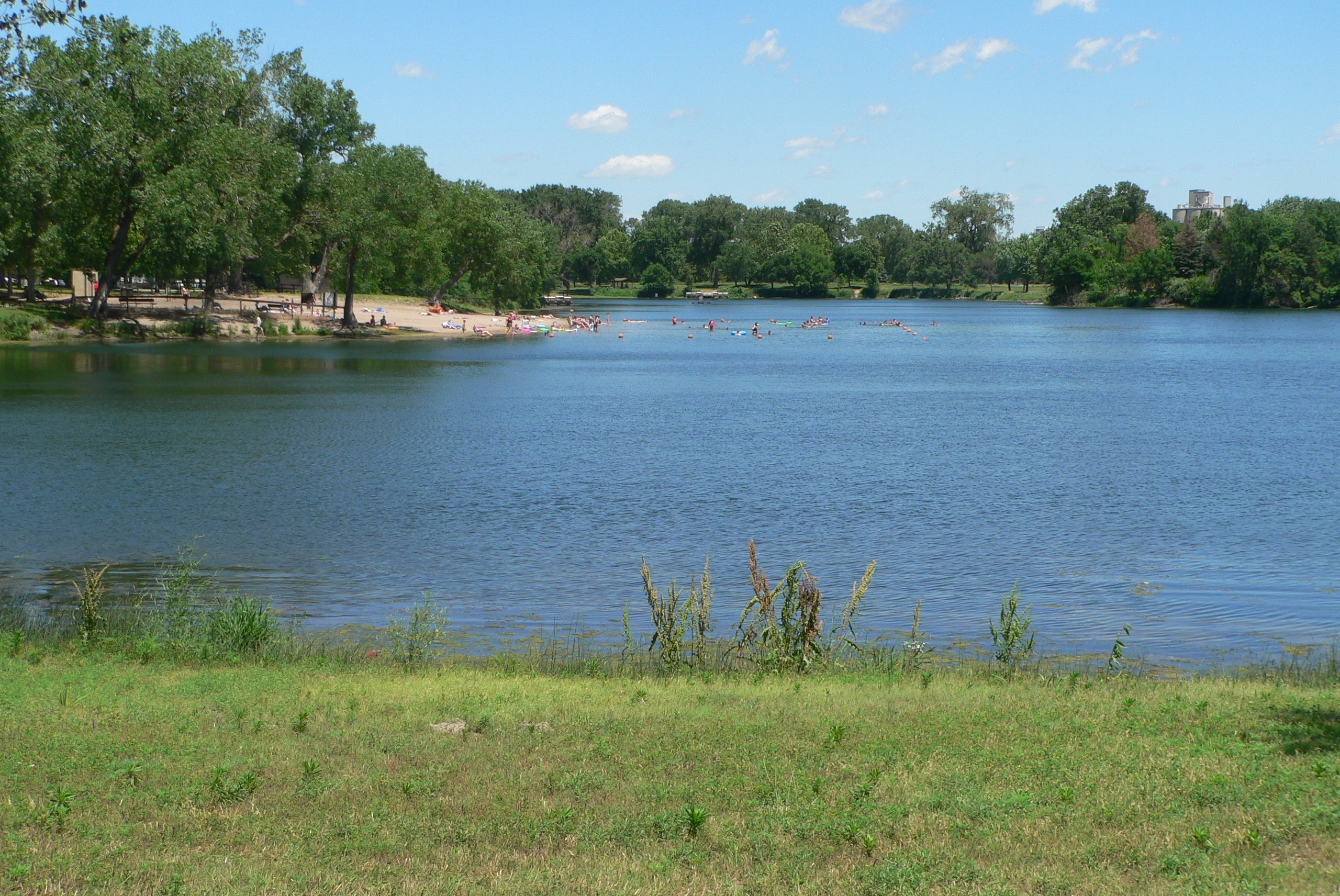
- Lake 2 with swimming beach at left

- Location within Nebraska
- Location: Cass County
- Nearest city: Louisville
- Coordinates: 41°00′15″N 96°10′01″W
- Area: 192 acres (78 ha)
- Operator: Nebraska Game and Parks Commission

Louisville State Recreation Area (Louisville SRA) is a 192-acre (0.78 km^{2}) recreation area located in Louisville, Nebraska along Nebraska Highway 50 on the south bank of the Platte River.

The area features five sandpit lakes, one of which is available for swimming. As of 2005 the area features 223 camping pads with electrical access.
