= Doug Taft =

English footballer

Personal information
- Full name: Douglas Taft
- Date of birth: 9 March 1926
- Place of birth: Leicester, England
- Date of death: 29 September 1987 (aged 61)
- Place of death: Derby, England
- Height: 6 ft 0 in (1.83 m)
- Position: Centre forward

Senior career*
Years	Team	Apps	(Gls)
19??–1947	Gresley Rovers		
1947–1949	Derby County	6	(1)
1949–195?	Wolverhampton Wanderers	0	(0)
1950–1952	Chelmsford City		
1952–1953	Bedford Town	40	(22)
1953–1955	Peterborough United	83	(50)
1955–1956	Kettering Town		
1956–195?	Rugby Town		
195?–1959	Hinckley Athletic		

Managerial career
- 195?–1959: Hinckley Athletic (player-manager)
- * Club domestic league appearances and goals

Douglas Taft (9 March 1926 – 29 September 1987) was an English footballer who made six appearances in the Football League playing as a centre forward for Derby County in the 1940s. He was on the books of Wolverhampton Wanderers without playing league football for the club, and also played non-league football for clubs including Gresley Rovers, Chelmsford City, Bedford Town, Peterborough United, Kettering Town, Rugby Town and Hinckley Athletic, where he was player-manager.

== Life and career ==
Taft was born in Leicester in 1926. He served in the Army during the Second World War, and was playing football for Gresley Rovers when he caught the attention of First Division club Derby County. He was of powerful build, six feet (1.83 m) tall and weighing 14 st (89 kg). After demobilisation, he signed professional forms in November 1947, and began his career playing for the reserve team in the Central League. He made his first-team debut in the league match away to Stoke City on 11 December 1948, deputising for Jack Stamps who failed a late fitness test, and scored the opening goal after 14 minutes, but Derby went on to lose 4–2. He returned to the team for the Christmas fixtures against reigning champions Arsenal, and created the goal with which Derby opened the scoring in a 2–1 win at the Baseball Ground:

Harrison gained possession and pushed the ball down his own wing to the wandering Taft, who, with a brilliant piece of foot jugglery, sold the dummy to Smith and whipped across a perfect centre. Broome was there to nod the ball home via the goalpost.

Taft kept his place for a few weeks, a period that included Derby's first three matches in the 1948–49 FA Cup. The Star Green 'Un thought he played his best game for Derby in the fifth-round win against Cardiff City and had developed a good understanding with inside left Billy Steel. However, Stamps returned to the side, and Taft made no more first-team appearances.

He was one of 33 professionals placed on Derby's retained list, but did not remain with the club for long. In July 1949, as part of a deal that took Wolves' Les Mynard to Derby and in the same week as he celebrated his wedding to Norma Allwood, Taft signed for Wolverhampton Wanderers as backup to Jesse Pye. He soon suffered a knee injury that required surgery, which deprived him of a chance to play for the first team when Pye was injured in January. When fit again, Taft was still unable to break into the first team, so he requested a transfer, and was listed at a fee reported as £5,000. There was interest from Second Division clubs, but eventually Taft signed for a Southern League club, Chelmsford City. His season was soon disrupted by injury and the need for a second cartilage operation, but he stayed on for a second season.

Ahead of the 1952–53 season, he was still on Wolves' retained list at a fee reported as £10,000. He reportedly came close to signing for Biggleswade Town of the United Counties League, but instead joined another Southern League club, Bedford Town. Because Ronnie Rooke, the club's player-manager, was established at centre forward, Taft played at inside left for Bedford. He ended the season with 29 goals from 53 appearances in all competitions, 22 from 40 in the Southern League, as the team finished third. The club wanted him to stay on, but the directors wanted to reduce the wage bill, and Taft was one of several professionals to refuse the terms offered.

He signed for Midland League club Peterborough United. He made a spectacular start: he scored in the opening fixture, then contributed five goals to a 9–1 win against Gainsborough Trinity, and a hat-trick in his sixth match, against York City's reserves, took his total to twelve in the first month of the season. His scoring rate slowed, but he finished the season as the Midland League's top scorer with 42 goals. He captained the team in the 1954–55 season, but his goalscoring deserted him, and he played much of the season at right half. He was given a free transfer at the end of the season, and returned to Southern League football with Kettering Town. A season later, he moved on to captain Rugby Town of the Birmingham & District League, and "served his side quietly and efficiently by nearly always being in the open space when the ball has come out his side of the centre. That he has not scored more goals is almost entirely due the fact that he favoured a berth well back to help the halves and the wingers." He moved on to Hinckley Athletic as player-manager, a post he resigned in January 1959.

Taft died in Derby in 1987 at the age of 61.
