= William A. Metzger =

American politician (1914–1985)

Member of the Nebraska Legislature from the 3rd district
- In office January 4, 1955 – January 1, 1957
- Preceded by: Tom Dooley
- Succeeded by: Tom Dooley
- In office January 7, 1947 – January 2, 1951
- Preceded by: Tom Dooley
- Succeeded by: Christian Metzger
- In office January 7, 1941 – January 5, 1943
- Preceded by: Fred Carsten
- Succeeded by: Tom Dooley

Personal details
- Born: October 21, 1914 Mynard, Nebraska
- Died: July 21, 1985 (aged 70) Omaha, Nebraska
- Party: Democratic
- Spouse: Katherine Mae Wegner (m. 1948)
- Children: 1
- Education: University of Nebraska; University of Omaha
- Occupation: Farming, insurance, real estate

Military service
- Allegiance: United States
- Branch/service: United States Army

William Allan Metzger (October 21, 1914 – July 21, 1985) was a Democratic politician from Nebraska who served as a member of the Nebraska Legislature from the 3rd district from 1941 to 1943, 1947 to 1951, and 1955 to 1957.

== Early life ==
Metzger was born in Mynard, Nebraska, in 1914. He graduated from Omaha Central High School and then attended the University of Omaha. Metzger attended the University of Nebraska College of Law for several years but did not graduate. He was a farmer in Cedar Creek.

== Nebraska Legislature ==
In 1938, Metzger challenged incumbent State Senator Fred Carsten for re-election. He was joined in the nonpartisan primary by farmer Charles Long, perennial candidate Arnold Lillie, and Martin Bloom. Metzger placed first in the primary election, winning 28 percent of the vote to Carsten's 26 percent and Bloom's 21 percent. Carsten and Metzger advanced to the general election, which Carsten narrowly won, defeating Metzger, 51–49 percent.

Carsten ran for a third term in 1940, and Metzger challenged him again. Beyond Carsten, he faced former State Senator William Banning, farmer David Crofoot, and former Sarpy County Assessor M. P. Petersen. Metzger placed first in the primary, winning 32 percent of the vote, and advanced to the general election against Carsten, who placed second with 27 percent. Metzger defeated Carsten in the general election, winning 53 percent of the vote to Carsten's 47 percent.

In 1942, Metzger enlisted in the U.S. Army, and though he did not resign from the legislature, he declined to seek re-election to a second term.

Metzger was succeeded by Tom Dooley, who also won re-election in 1944. In 1946, Metzger, who had remained in France after the end of World War II to manage the surplus property at an army depot, announced that he would challenge Dooley upon returning to the country. Metzger placed first in the primary election, winning 45 percent of the vote to Dole's 33 percent. In the general election, Metzger defeated Dooley by a narrow margin, receiving 53 percent of the vote to Dooley's 47 percent.

In 1948, Metzger ran for re-election. He had no opponents file against him, though banker Elmer Hallstrom received 229 votes as a write-in candidate. Hallstrom was not a candidate in the general election, and Metzger won re-election unopposed.

Metzger declined to seek re-election in 1950, citing other commitments that precluded him from dedicating himself to legislative service. His father, former State Representative Christian Metzger, ran to succeed him, and ultimately won. His father served only a single term, and in 1952, was succeeded by Tom Dooley.

In 1954, Metzger challenged Dooley for re-election. He placed first in the primary over Dooley by a wide margin, winning 56 percent of the vote to his 44 percent. In the general election, Metzger ultimately defeated Dooley, winning 54–46 percent. Metzger declined to seek re-election in 1956, and was succeeded by Dooley.

== Post-legislative career ==
Metzger ran for the Omaha Public Power District Board of Directors in 1962, ultimately defeating incumbent B. H. Baer. He was re-elected in 1968, and declined to seek re-election to a third term in 1974, citing ill health.

== Death ==
Metzger died on July 21, 1985.
