= Young Cemetery Cabin =

Historic site in Cass County, Nebraska

- U.S. National Register of Historic Places
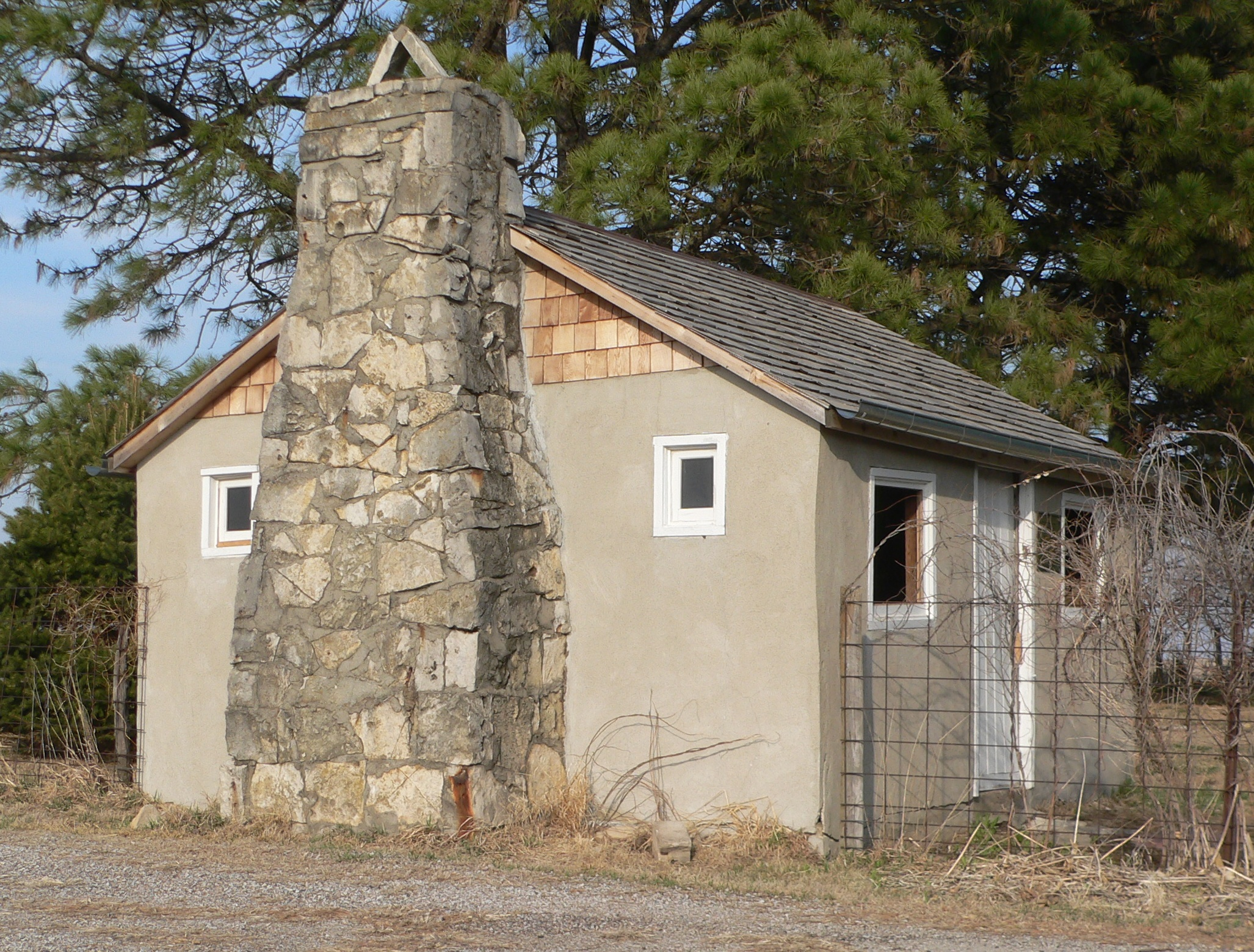

- Location within Nebraska Location within the United States
- Nearest city: Plattsmouth, Nebraska
- Coordinates: 40°56′26″N 95°54′17″W
- Area: less than one acre
- Built: 1941
- Built by: National Youth Administration
- Architectural style: Log cabin
- NRHP reference No.: 04001408
- Added to NRHP: December 30, 2004

The Young Cemetery Cabin, in Cass County, Nebraska near Plattsmouth, Nebraska, was built in 1941. It was listed on the National Register of Historic Places in 2004.

It is located at the Young Cemetery, which was founded in 1855. Logs to build this cabin were taken from a log cabin built in 1856. It was built by the National Youth Administration.

It is also known as the National Youth Administration Cabin.

It is located at Young Ln. E400.
