= Tom Dooley (politician) =

American politician (1880–1958)

Member of the Nebraska Legislature from the 3rd district
- In office January 1, 1957 – October 12, 1958
- Preceded by: William A. Metzger
- Succeeded by: Edwin McHugh
- In office January 6, 1953 – January 4, 1955
- Preceded by: Christian Metzger
- Succeeded by: William A. Metzger
- In office January 5, 1943 – January 7, 1947
- Preceded by: William A. Metzger
- Succeeded by: William A. Metzger

Personal details
- Born: October 11, 1880 Salem, New York
- Died: October 12, 1958 (aged 78) Lincoln, Nebraska
- Party: Democratic
- Spouse: Geneva L. Critchfield (m. 1910)
- Children: 2
- Education: Fremont Normal College
- Occupation: Abstractor

Tom Dooley (October 11, 1880 – October 12, 1958) was a Democratic politician from Nebraska who served as a member of the Nebraska Legislature from the 3rd district from 1943 to 1947, 1953 to 1955, and 1957 until his death in 1958.

== Early life ==
Dooley was born in Salem, New York, in 1880, and moved to Nebraska in 1886. He grew up in Fremont, and attended the Fremont Normal College. He was appointed the deputy county clerk in Sarpy County in 1911 after W. E. Patterson was elected.

In 1916, Dooley ran for County Clerk, and won the Democratic nomination unopposed. Following the primary election, Patterson resigned as County Clerk, and Dooley was appointed by the board of county commissioners as his replacement. In the general election, he narrowly defeated Republican nominee Ernest Ruff. Dooley was re-elected in 1918, and defeated in 1922 by Republican J. E. Strawn.

Dooley ran for Sarpy County Judge in 1928, challenging incumbent Judge J. M. Wheat for re-election, but was narrowly defeated in the general election. He unsuccessfully challenged Wheat again in 1932. When Wheat died in 1934, H. A. Collins was appointed as his replacement, and Dooley challenged him, but lost.

== Nebraska Legislature ==
In 1942, incumbent State Senator William A. Metzger, who was serving in the U.S. Army, declined to seek re-election to a second term. Dooley ran to succeed him in the 3rd district, which included Cass and Sarpy counties. Dooley ran in a crowded primary, and narrowly placed second, receiving 16 percent of the vote to former State Representative Mabel Gillespie's 19 percent, and they advanced to the general election. Dooley narrowly defeated Gillespie, winning 51 percent of the vote to her 49 percent.

Dooley ran for re-election in 1944, and was challenged by Mrs. John Harold Brunson, a former teacher; Henry Wendt, a farmer; Charles Long, a businessman; and John B. Peterson and W. B. Banning, former state senators. Dooley placed first in the primary, winning 45 percent of the vote to Banning's 36 percent. They advanced to the general election, which Dooley won by a wide margin, defeating Banning, 58–42 percent.

In 1946, Dooley ran for a third term, and was opposed by former State Senator William A. Metzger and W. O. Schewe. In the nonpartisan primary, Metzger won 45 percent of the vote, and Dooley placed second with 33 percent. Metzger narrowly defeated Dooley in the general election, winning 53 percent of the vote to Dooley's 47 percent.

Dooley ran for Lieutenant Governor in 1950. In the Democratic primary, Dooley faced businessman Edward Dosek, who was endorsed by the state party convention; former Oklahoma State Senator C. S. Wortman; and businessman Woodrow Bryan Shurtleff. Dooley lost the primary, receiving 24 percent of the vote to Dosek's 47 percent.

In 1952, Dooley ran for the state legislature. Incumbent State Senator Christian Metzger, the father of William A. Metzger, declined to run for re-election to a second term. He ran against Edwin McHugh, an attorney and banker, and narrowly placed second in the primary, receiving 49 percent of the vote to McHugh's 51 percent. In the general election, Dooley defeated McHugh by a thin margin, winning 51–49 percent.

Dooley ran for re-election in 1954, and was challenged by former State Senator William A. Metzger. Metzger placed first in the primary, winning 56 percent of the vote to Dooley's 44 percent. They advanced to the general election, which Metzger won, defeating Dooley with 54 percent of the vote.

Metzger declined to seek re-election in 1956, and Dooley ran to succeed him. In the nonpartisan primary, Dooley was opposed by businessman Jerry Strawn, banker Emil Fricke, and Bellevue City Attorney John Rice. Dooley placed first in the primary, receiving 34 percent of the vote to Fricke's 30 percent, and proceeded to the general election. Dooley defeated Fricke by a thin margin, winning by 269 votes, and receiving 51 percent of the vote to Fricke's 49 percent.

Dooley ran for re-election in 1958. He faced a crowded field of opponents, and was challenged by real estate broker H. L. Gayer and attorney Gerald Kiltz, as well as two former opponents: banker and attorney Edwin McHugh and businessman Jerry Strawn. Dooley placed first in the primary with 35 percent of the vote, and advanced to the general election with Gayer, who placed second with 29 percent.

On October 12, 1958, three weeks prior to the general election, Dooley died.
