= Snoke Farmstead =

- U.S. National Register of Historic Places
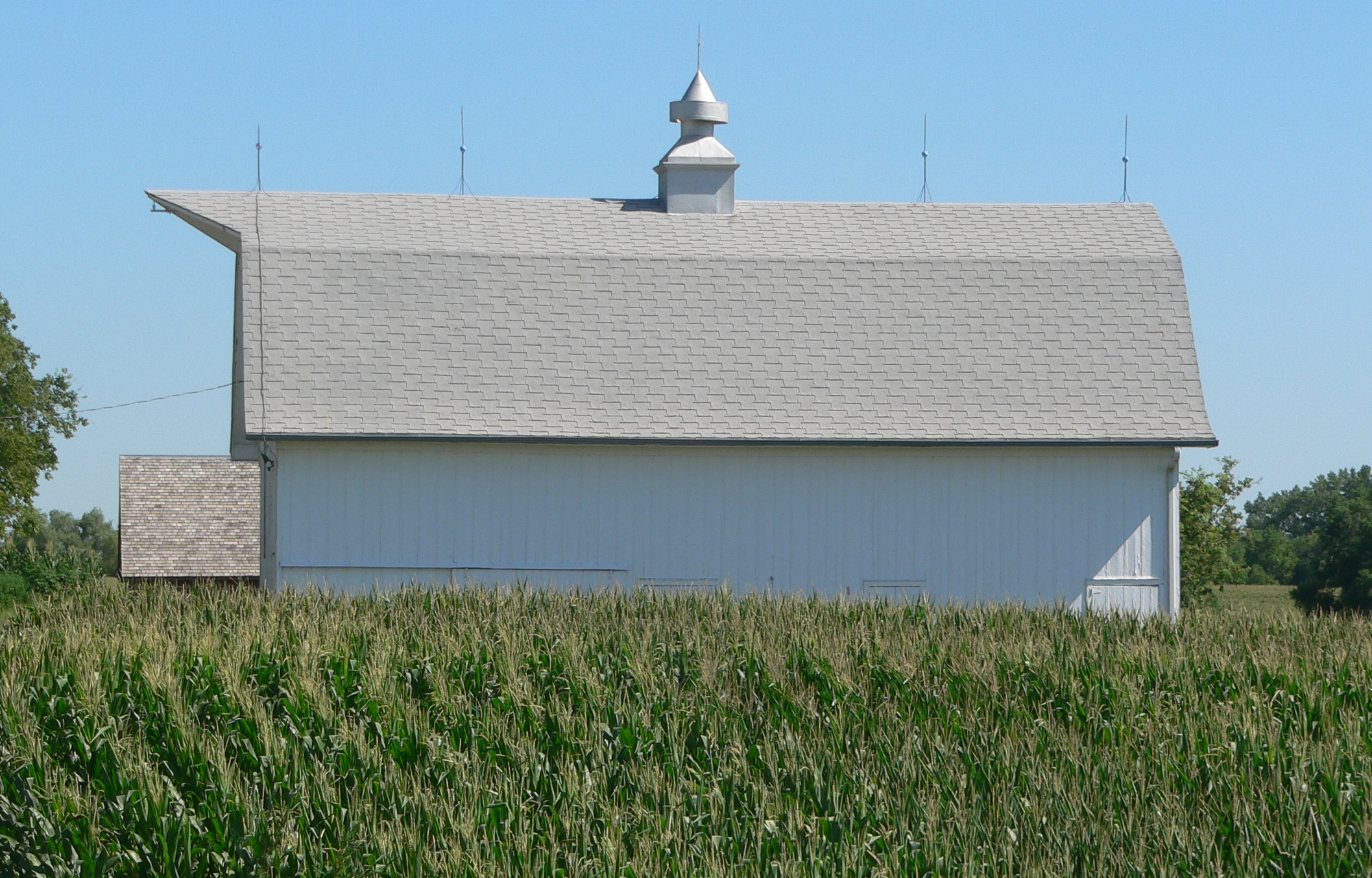

- Location within Nebraska Location within the United States
- Nearest city: Eagle, Nebraska
- Coordinates: 40.813815°N 96.394876°W
- Area: 4 acres (1.6 ha)
- Built: 1875
- NRHP reference No.: 98000189
- Added to NRHP: March 5, 1998

The Snoke Farmstead, in Cass County, Nebraska near Eagle, Nebraska, was listed on the National Register of Historic Places in 1998. The listing included eight contributing buildings, a contributing structure, and a contributing site on 4 acres (1.6 ha).

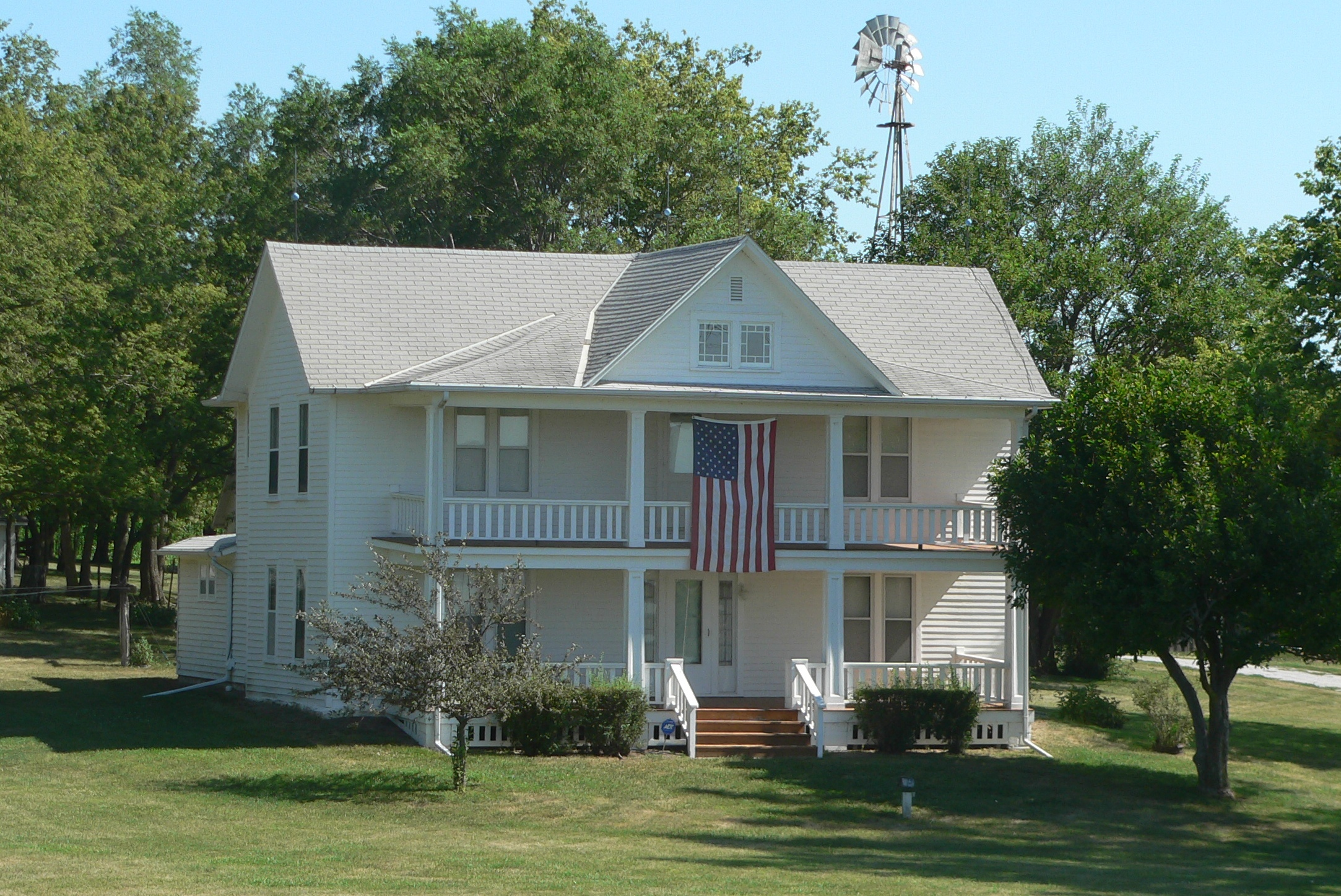
the farmhouse

Some part of the farmstead dates from 1875.

It has also been known as Snoke-Tate Farmstead.

It is located at 23416 O St., which is U.S. Route 34 (US 34) about 2 miles (3.2 km) east of Eagle.
