= Manley School =

- U.S. National Register of Historic Places
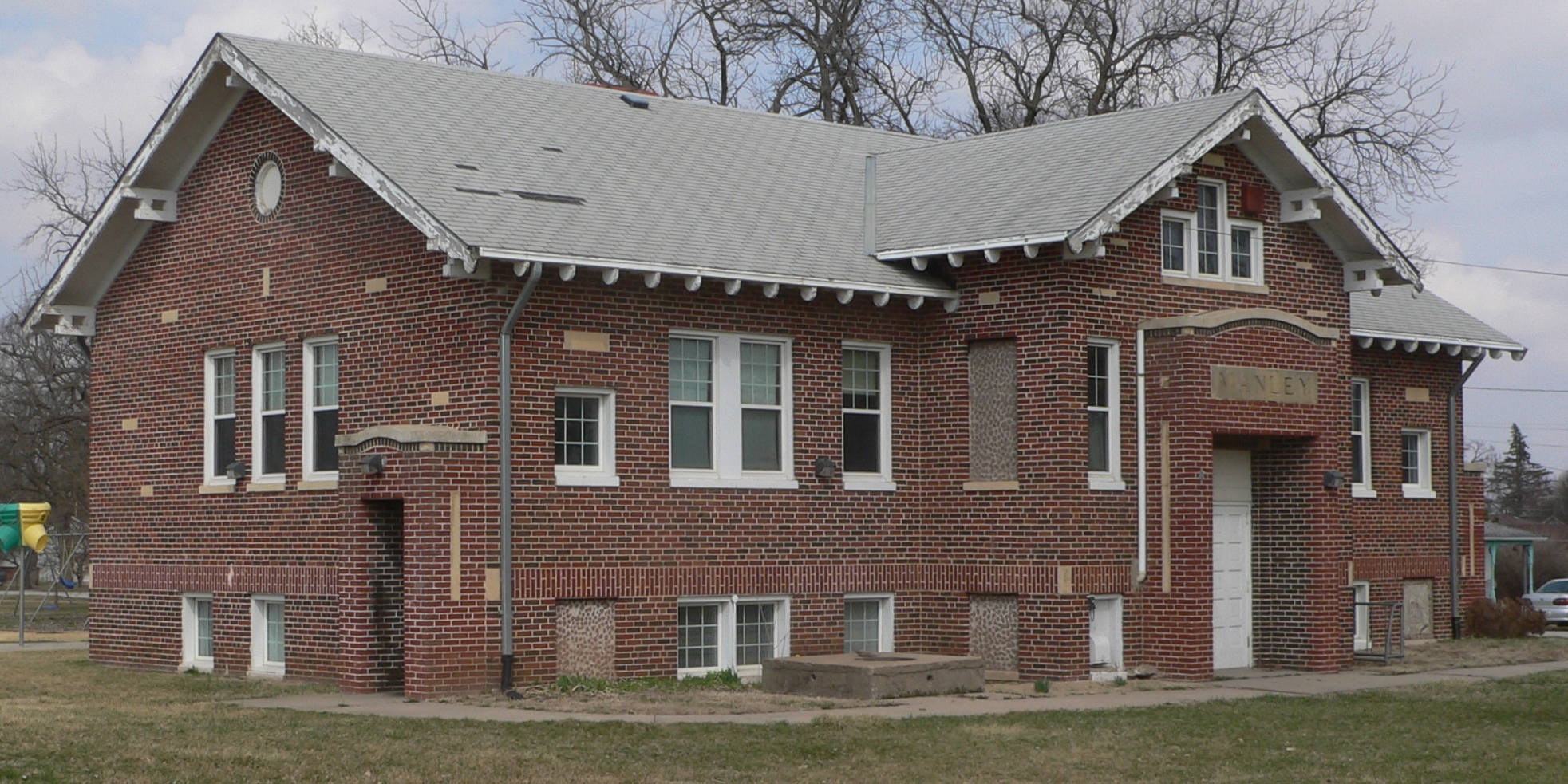

- Location within Nebraska Location within the United States
- Location: 115 Cherry St., Manley, Nebraska
- Coordinates: 40°55′14″N 96°10′04″W
- Area: 1.8 acres (0.73 ha)
- Built: 1931
- Architectural style: Craftsman
- MPS: School Buildings in Nebraska MPS
- NRHP reference No.: 04001414
- Added to NRHP: December 30, 2004

The Manley School, at 115 Cherry St. in Manley, Nebraska, was built in 1931. It was listed on the National Register of Historic Places in 2004.

It was deemed to be "a fine example of the Craftsman style of architecture applied to a public building." When listed in 2004, the school had served for more than 70 years and was still in use.

The 1931 school replaced one built in 1889. Enrollment in the school District 96 was 45 students in 1888, 75 in 1904. It housed grades K-10 until 1950. From 1982 on it was just K-6.
