= Clara Buswell House =

Historic house in Massachusetts, United States

- U.S. National Register of Historic Places
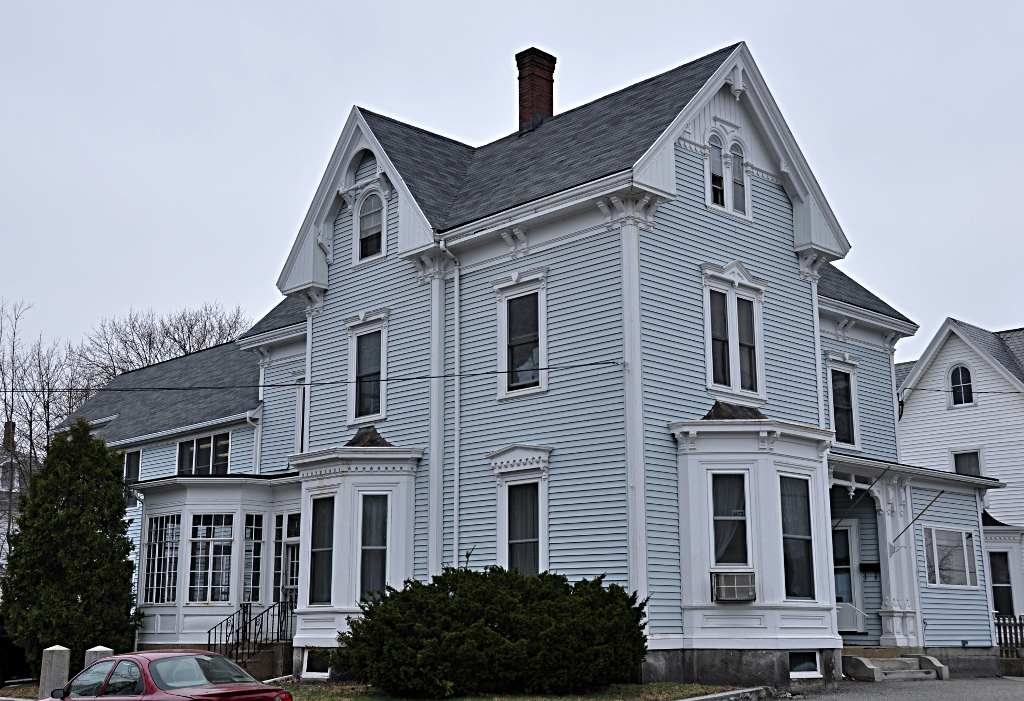

- Location within Massachusetts Location within the United States
- Location: 481 Main Street, Stoneham, Massachusetts
- Coordinates: 42°28′31″N 71°6′5″W
- Built: 1875
- Architectural style: Italianate
- MPS: Stoneham MRA
- NRHP reference No.: 84002528
- Added to NRHP: April 13, 1984

The Clara Buswell House is a historic house at 481 Main Street in Stoneham, Massachusetts. Built about 1875, it is one a few surviving Italianate houses on Main Street south of Central Square, which was once lined with elegant houses. The house was listed on the National Register of Historic Places in 1984. It now houses professional offices.

== Description and history ==
The house stands on the west side of Main Street (Massachusetts Route 28), between Linden and Gerry Street. Just to its north stands the nearly identical Onslow Gilmore House. It is a 2 1/2-story wood-frame structure, with an L-shaped floorplan that includes a porch in the crook of the L. The porch originally sheltered a double door, but part of the porch has been enclosed, and the original door replaced by a single smaller one. The house has also been clad in aluminum, but much of the Italianate detailing, including bracketed cornices, ornate window lintels, and ornately boxed bay windows, has been retained. The house lot also retains original stone curbing and posts at the sidewalk edges on both Main and Gerry Streets.

The house may have been built by Onslow Gilmore, a prominent local businessman, banker, and real estate developer, as a speculative venture. Its first documented owner was Clara Buswell, in 1889. Houses similar to these were built in large numbers on Main Street after the American Civil War; these two are among the few that survive.

== See also ==
- Onslow Gilmore House, a similar house next door
- National Register of Historic Places listings in Stoneham, Massachusetts
- National Register of Historic Places listings in Middlesex County, Massachusetts
