= Gottfried Gustav Pitz Barn =

- Pitz, Gottfried Gustav, Barn
- U.S. National Register of Historic Places
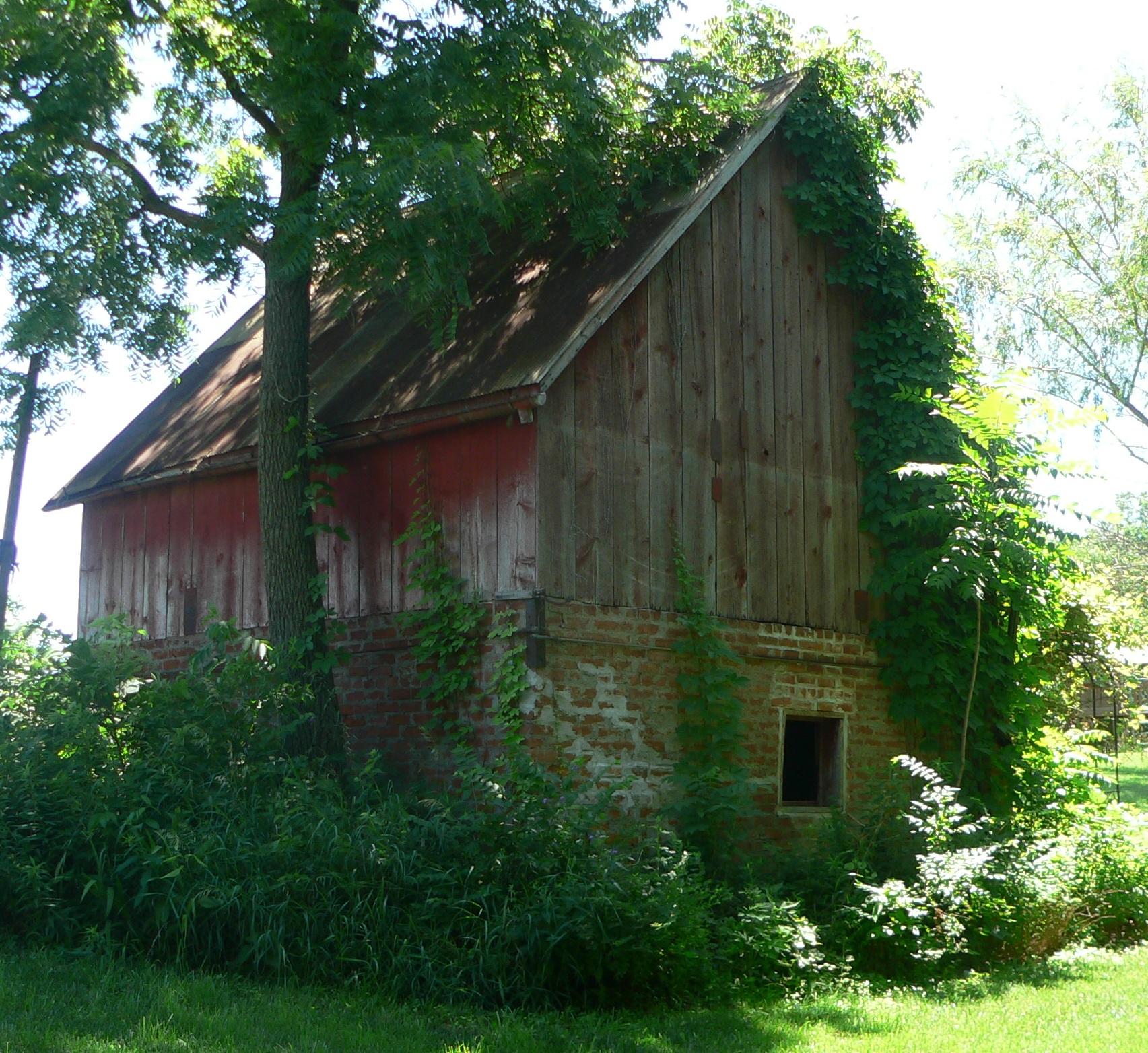

- Location within Nebraska
- Nearest city: Plattsmouth, Nebraska
- Coordinates: 41°00′07″N 95°52′30″W
- Area: less than one acre
- Built: 1883
- Built by: Pitz, Gottfried Gustav
- Architectural style: Banked Barn (German)
- NRHP reference No.: 12000564
- Added to NRHP: August 27, 2012

The Gottfried Gustav Pitz Barn in Cass County, Nebraska near Plattsmouth, Nebraska is a German banked barn built in 1883 by Gottfried Gustav Pitz. It was listed on the National Register of Historic Places in 2012.

Pitz came to the United States from Germany in 1868, at age 19. He was a market gardener who brought produce into Plattsmouth and Omaha to sell.

It is a one-and-a-half-story 16 by 16 feet (4.9 m × 4.9 m) plan barn, with a dry brick floor.

It has also been known as the Pitz-Muller Barn.

It is located at 903 Livingston Rd.
