= Walker Gilmore site =

- Walker Gilmore Site (22CC28)
- U.S. National Register of Historic Places
- U.S. National Historic Landmark
- Location within Nebraska Location within the United States
- Location: Northeastern quarter of the northeastern quarter of Section 28, Township 11 North, Range 14 East
- Nearest city: Weeping Water, Nebraska
- Coordinates: 40°53′59″N 95°50′14″W
- NRHP reference No.: 66000441

Significant dates
- Added to NRHP: October 15, 1966
- Designated NHL: July 19, 1964

The Walker Gilmore Site, designated by the Smithsonian trinomial 22CC28, is a prehistoric archaeological site near Murray, Nebraska. First formally investigated in 1915, it is the type site for the Sterns Creek focus, the first Woodland period culture identified in Nebraska. It was designated a National Historic Landmark in 1964.

== Description ==
The Walker Gilmore Site is a deeply stratified archaeological site on a terrace above Sterns Creek in eastern Cass County. The area consists of repeated habitation layers, interspersed with materials washed down from the hillside above. Finds at the site include evidence of dwelling lodges using poles as support and finished in wattle and daub or bark, as well as a diversity of tools, tool-making artifacts, pottery, and remnants of dietary plants and animals. Radiocarbon dating has yielded occupation dates as late as 1100 CE. One particular set of post-holes are unusually small, and have been interpreted as possibly supporting a rack-like structure for drying meat.

The Walker Gilmore Site was found in 1915 by Walker Gilmore, the son of a local physician, who then informed archaeologist Frederick Sterns, then doing graduate field research in Nebraska. It was the first site in the state where evidence of a pre-village culture was identified. Sterns also made key observations about the nature of the terrain, leading to the conclusion that the streambed above which the site lies was probably wider at the time of the site's occupation. In the 1930s, William Duncan Strong investigated the site further, and connected its inhabitants to Woodland cultures of the northeastern United States.

== See also ==
- List of National Historic Landmarks in Nebraska
