= George E. Dovey House =

- U.S. National Register of Historic Places
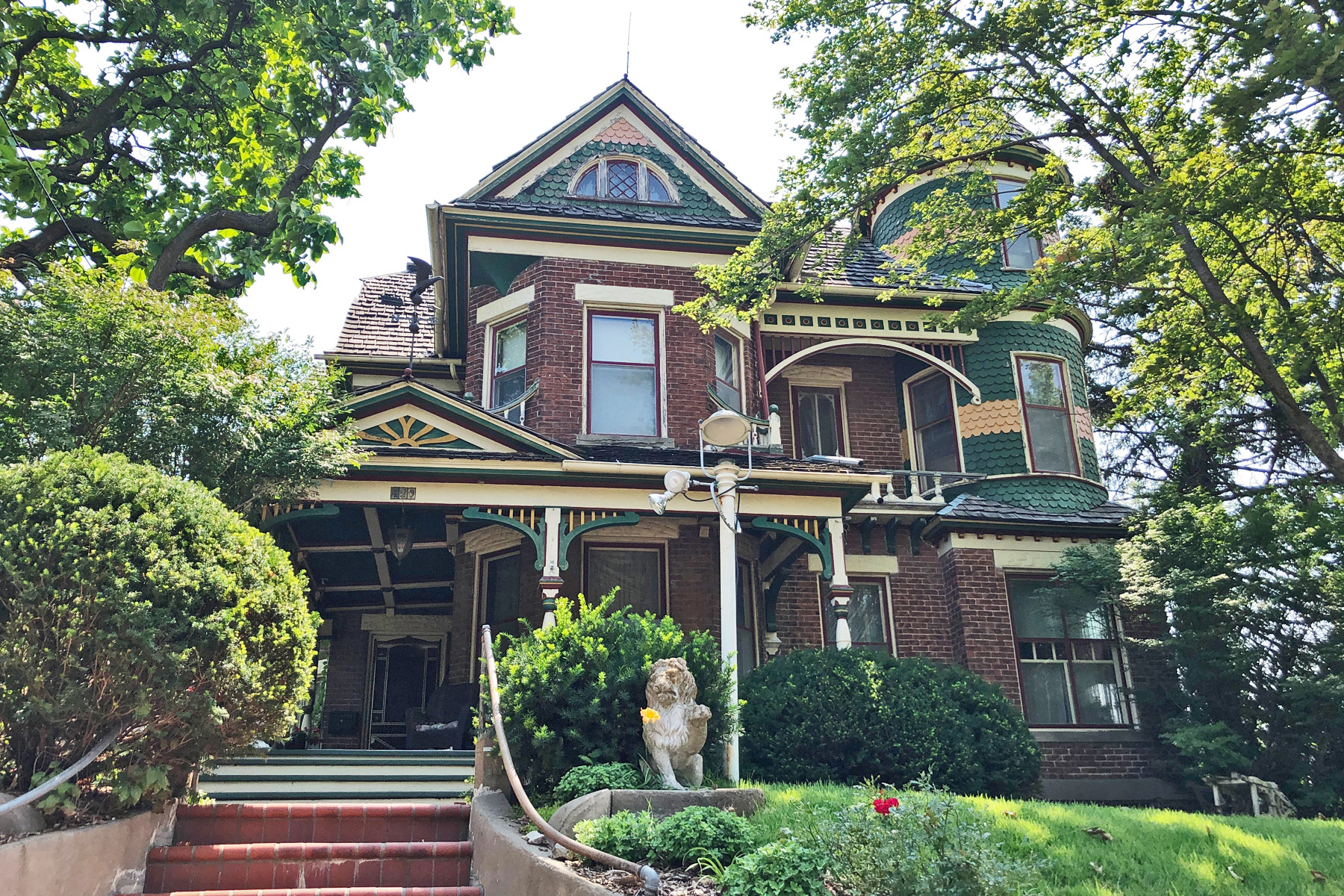

- Location within Nebraska Location within the United States
- Location: 423 N. 4th St. Plattsmouth, Nebraska
- Coordinates: 41°00′54″N 95°53′02″W
- Area: less than one acre
- Built: c.1887
- Architectural style: Queen Anne
- NRHP reference No.: 100003091
- Added to NRHP: November 5, 2018

The George E. Dovey House, in Plattsmouth, Nebraska in Cass County, Nebraska, was listed on the National Register of Historic Places in 2018.

Also known as The Heights, it was built for businessman George E. Dovey around 1887. It is Queen Anne in style. Queen Anne features include its "steeply-pitched roof with intersecting, asymmetrical cross gables, multiple variations of spindle work throughout both the interior and exterior, a one-story veranda along the front elevation and wraps around to the side, and a rounded tower on a prominent corner of the house that extends past the roofline." Inside it has its "original hardwood floors, pocket doors, elaborate woodwork, and period-appropriate wallpaper." It was deemed significant as a local example "of a Late Victorian home in the Queen Anne subtype."

It was listed along with the Velosco V. Leonard House, also in Plattsmouth.

It is located at 423 N 4th St. in Plattsmouth.
