= Avoca, Nebraska =

Village in Nebraska, US

- Village
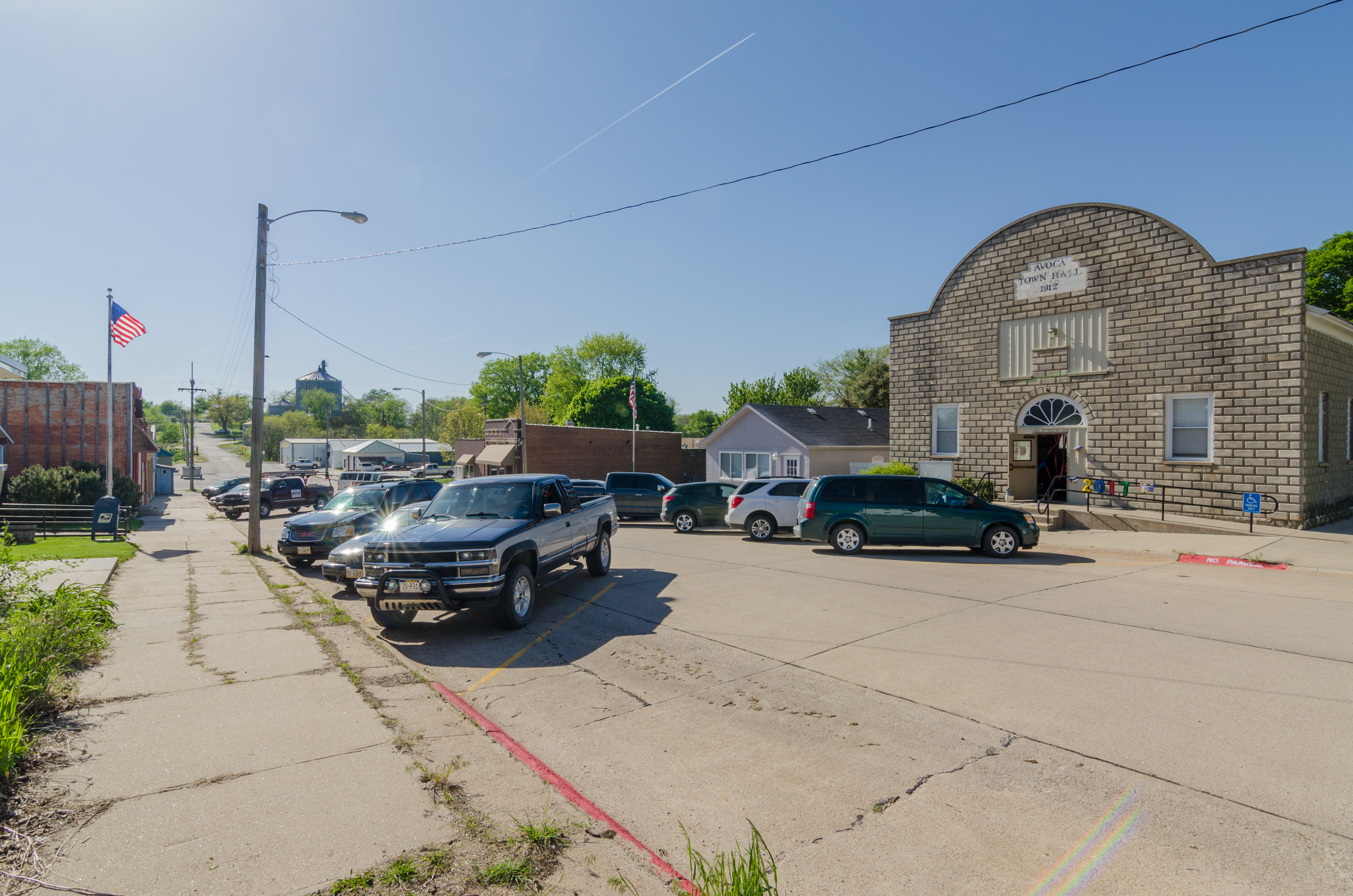

- Location of Avoca, Nebraska
- Coordinates: 40°47′47″N 96°07′09″W
- Country: United States
- State: Nebraska
- County: Cass

Area
  - Total: 0.13 sq mi (0.34 km^{2})
  - Land: 0.13 sq mi (0.34 km^{2})
  - Water: 0 sq mi (0.00 km^{2})
- Elevation: 1,168 ft (356 m)

Population (2020)
  - Total: 178
  - Density: 1,360.9/sq mi (525.43/km^{2})
- Time zone: UTC-6 (Central (CST))
  - Summer (DST): UTC-5 (CDT)
- ZIP code: 68307
- Area code: 402
- FIPS code: 31-02795
- GNIS feature ID: 2398012
- Website: http://www.AvocaNebraska.com

Avoca is a village in Cass County, Nebraska, United States. The population was 178 at the 2020 census.

== History ==
Avoca was platted in 1882 when a new railroad line was extended to that point. The village is named after the River Avoca, in Ireland.

== Geography ==
According to the United States Census Bureau, the village has a total area of 0.13 square miles (0.34 km^{2}), all land.

== Demographics ==
Historical population
Census	Pop.	Note	%±
1890	166		—
1900	255		53.6%
1910	249		−2.4%
1920	231		−7.2%
1930	222		−3.9%
1940	197		−11.3%
1950	196		−0.5%
1960	218		11.2%
1970	229		5.0%
1980	242		5.7%
1990	254		5.0%
2000	270		6.3%
2010	242		−10.4%
2020	178		−26.4%
U.S. Decennial Census

=== 2010 census ===
As of the census of 2010, there were 242 people, 94 households, and 68 families living in the village. The population density was 1,861.5 inhabitants per square mile (718.7/km^{2}). There were 107 housing units at an average density of 823.1 per square mile (317.8/km^{2}). The racial makeup of the village was 95.0% White, 2.1% Native American, 0.8% from other races, and 2.1% from two or more races. Hispanic or Latino of any race were 2.9% of the population.

There were 94 households, of which 36.2% had children under the age of 18 living with them, 59.6% were married couples living together, 6.4% had a female householder with no husband present, 6.4% had a male householder with no wife present, and 27.7% were non-families. 24.5% of all households were made up of individuals, and 8.5% had someone living alone who was 65 years of age or older. The average household size was 2.57 and the average family size was 3.04.

The median age in the village was 37.3 years. 28.9% of residents were under the age of 18; 6.6% were between the ages of 18 and 24; 25.2% were from 25 to 44; 26% were from 45 to 64; and 13.2% were 65 years of age or older. The gender makeup of the village was 50.8% male and 49.2% female.

=== 2000 census ===
As of the census of 2000, there were 270 people, 105 households, and 70 families living in the village. The population density was 2,030.2 inhabitants per square mile (783.9/km^{2}). There were 108 housing units at an average density of 812.1 per square mile (313.6/km^{2}). The racial makeup of the village was 100.00% White. Hispanic or Latino of any race were 2.59% of the population.

There were 105 households, out of which 37.1% had children under the age of 18 living with them, 58.1% were married couples living together, 5.7% had a female householder with no husband present, and 32.4% were non-families. 26.7% of all households were made up of individuals, and 10.5% had someone living alone who was 65 years of age or older. The average household size was 2.57 and the average family size was 3.15.

In the village, the population was spread out, with 31.5% under the age of 18, 4.4% from 18 to 24, 30.0% from 25 to 44, 20.0% from 45 to 64, and 14.1% who were 65 years of age or older. The median age was 33 years. For every 100 females, there were 104.5 males. For every 100 females age 18 and over, there were 92.7 males.

As of 2000 the median income for a household in the village was $36,250, and the median income for a family was $44,167. Males had a median income of $32,250 versus $22,500 for females. The per capita income for the village was $15,270. About 2.6% of families and 6.1% of the population were below the poverty line, including none of those under the age of eighteen and 20.6% of those 65 or over.

== Culture ==
Avoca is home to the Quack-Off duck races, held annually on the last Saturday in January since 1980. Today, the race normally draws approximately 400 racers and 3500-4000 spectators. Registration normally begins on main street in Quack-Off Headquarters. Proceeds from the race benefit the Avoca Rural Volunteer Fire Department.
