= The Elms (Elmwood, Nebraska) =

- U.S. National Register of Historic Places
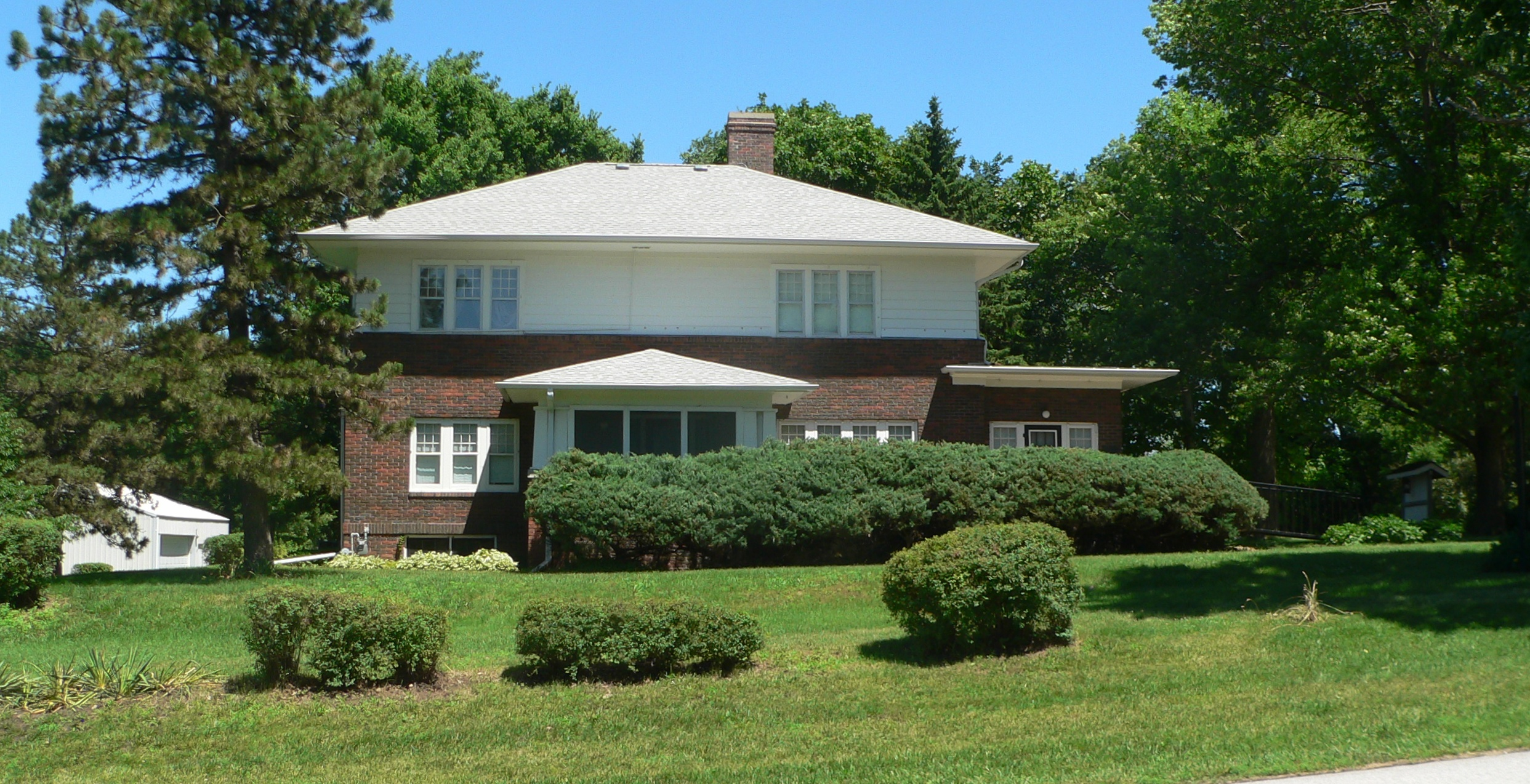

- Location within Nebraska Location within the United States
- Location: 204 East F Street, Elmwood, Nebraska
- Coordinates: 40.844206°N 96.291825°W
- Area: less than one acre
- Built: 1922
- Architectural style: Prairie School
- NRHP reference No.: 77000824
- Added to NRHP: March 24, 1977

The Elms, also known as the Bess Streeter Aldrich House, was listed on the National Register of Historic Places in 1977.

Built in 1922 in Prairie School style, it was home of author Bess Streeter Aldrich.

It is a two-story frame house with brick veneer.

It is located off one block off Nebraska Highway 1 at 204 East F Street.
