= Onslow Gilmore House =

Historic house in Massachusetts, United States

- U.S. National Register of Historic Places
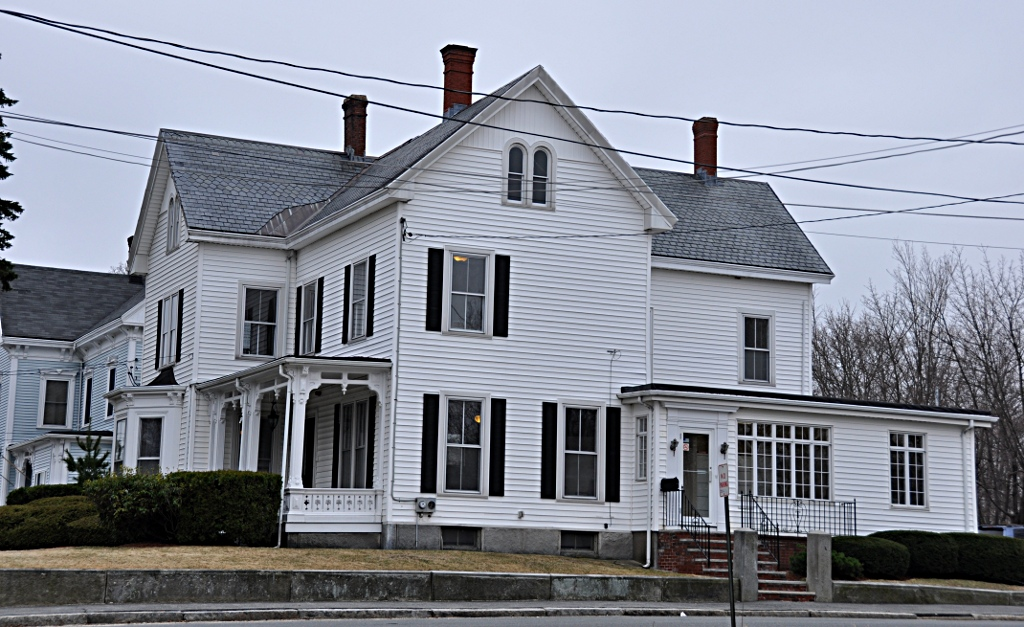

- Location within Massachusetts Location within the United States
- Location: 477 Main St., Stoneham, Massachusetts
- Coordinates: 42°28′32″N 71°6′8″W
- Built: 1875
- Architectural style: Italianate, High Victorian Italianate
- MPS: Stoneham MRA
- NRHP reference No.: 84002625
- Added to NRHP: April 13, 1984

The Onslow Gilmore House is a historic house at 477 Main Street in Stoneham, Massachusetts. Built about 1875, it is one of the few surviving Italianate houses of many that once lined Main Street south of Central Square. It was listed on the National Register of Historic Places in 1984. It now houses professional offices.

== Description and history ==
The Onslow Gilmore House stands on the west side of Main Street (Massachusetts Route 28), between Linden and Gerry Street. Just to its south stands the nearly identical Clara Buswell House. It is a 2 1/2-story wood-frame structure, with an L-shaped floor plan that includes a porch in the crook of the L. Although the house has been renovated, it has retained some of its Italianate detailing on the porch and front bay window. The porch is supported by bracket square posts, with valance-like woodwork between them, and the front-facing polygonal bay window has a cornice decorated with paired brackets. Narrow round-arch windows, also a typical Italianate feature, are found in the gables, and the building retains its slate roof. The house lot also retains original stone curbing and posts at the sidewalk edges on both Main and Linden Streets.

The house was built by Onslow Gilmore, a local businessman involved in real estate, insurance, and banking. Houses similar to these were built in large numbers on Main Street after the American Civil War; this house and the Buswell House two are among the few that survive.

== See also ==
- National Register of Historic Places listings in Stoneham, Massachusetts
- National Register of Historic Places listings in Middlesex County, Massachusetts
