= Velosco V. Leonard House =

- U.S. National Register of Historic Places
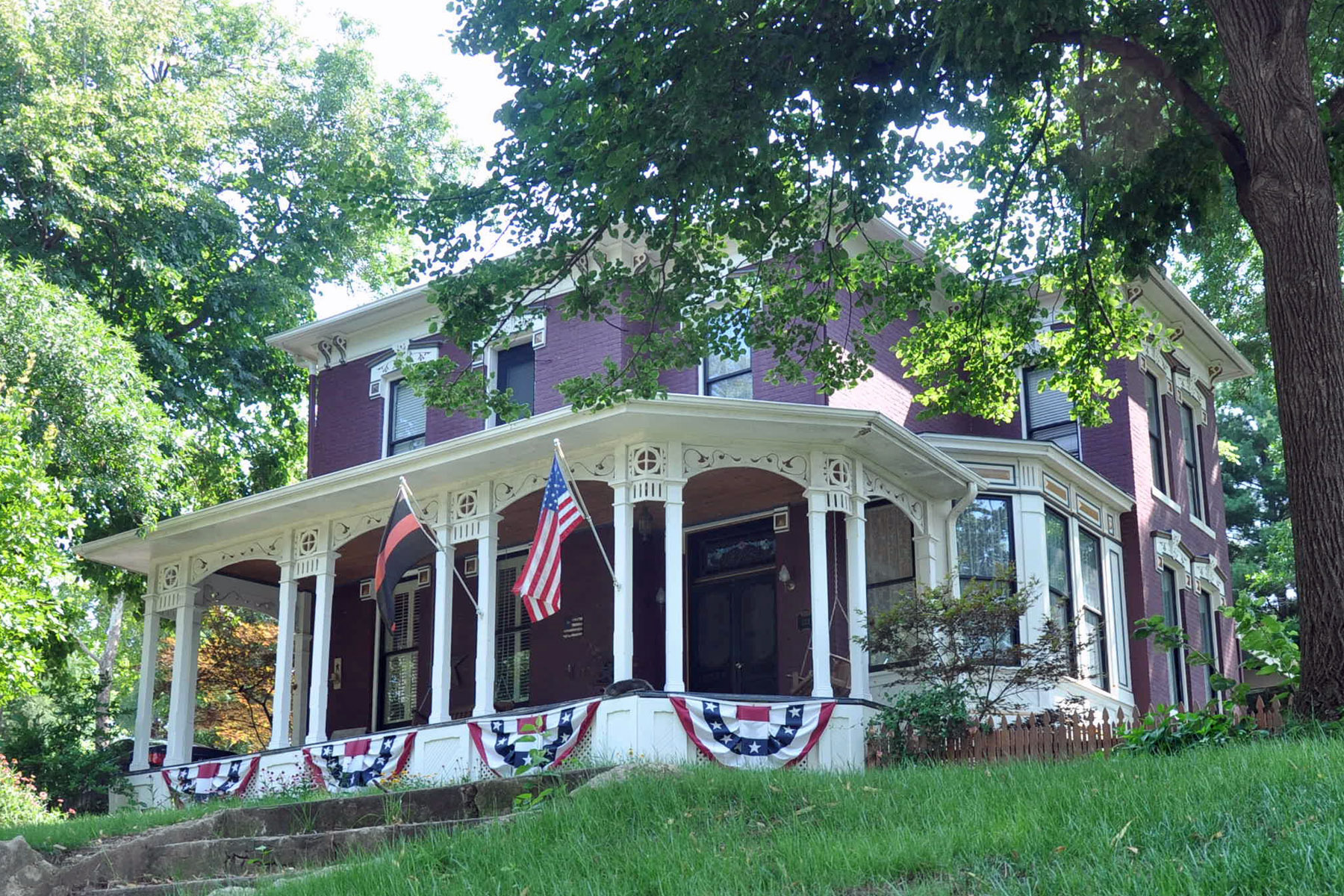

- Location within Nebraska Location within the United States
- Location: 323 N. 6th St. Plattsmouth, Nebraska
- Coordinates: 41°00′51″N 95°53′10″W
- Area: less than one acre
- Built: 1883
- Architectural style: Italianate
- NRHP reference No.: 100003092
- Added to NRHP: November 5, 2018

The Velosco V. Leonard House, at 323. N 6th Street in Plattsmouth, Nebraska, was built in 1883 and listed on the National Register of Historic Places in 2018. It was listed along with the George E. Dovey House, also in Plattsmouth.

It was originally the home of photographer Velosco V. Leonard, whose studio is on the National Register within the Plattsmouth Main Street Historic District. The house was deemed significant "as a fine representation of a Late Victorian home in the Italianate style."
