= Mynard Road Bridge =

- Bridge
- U.S. National Register of Historic Places
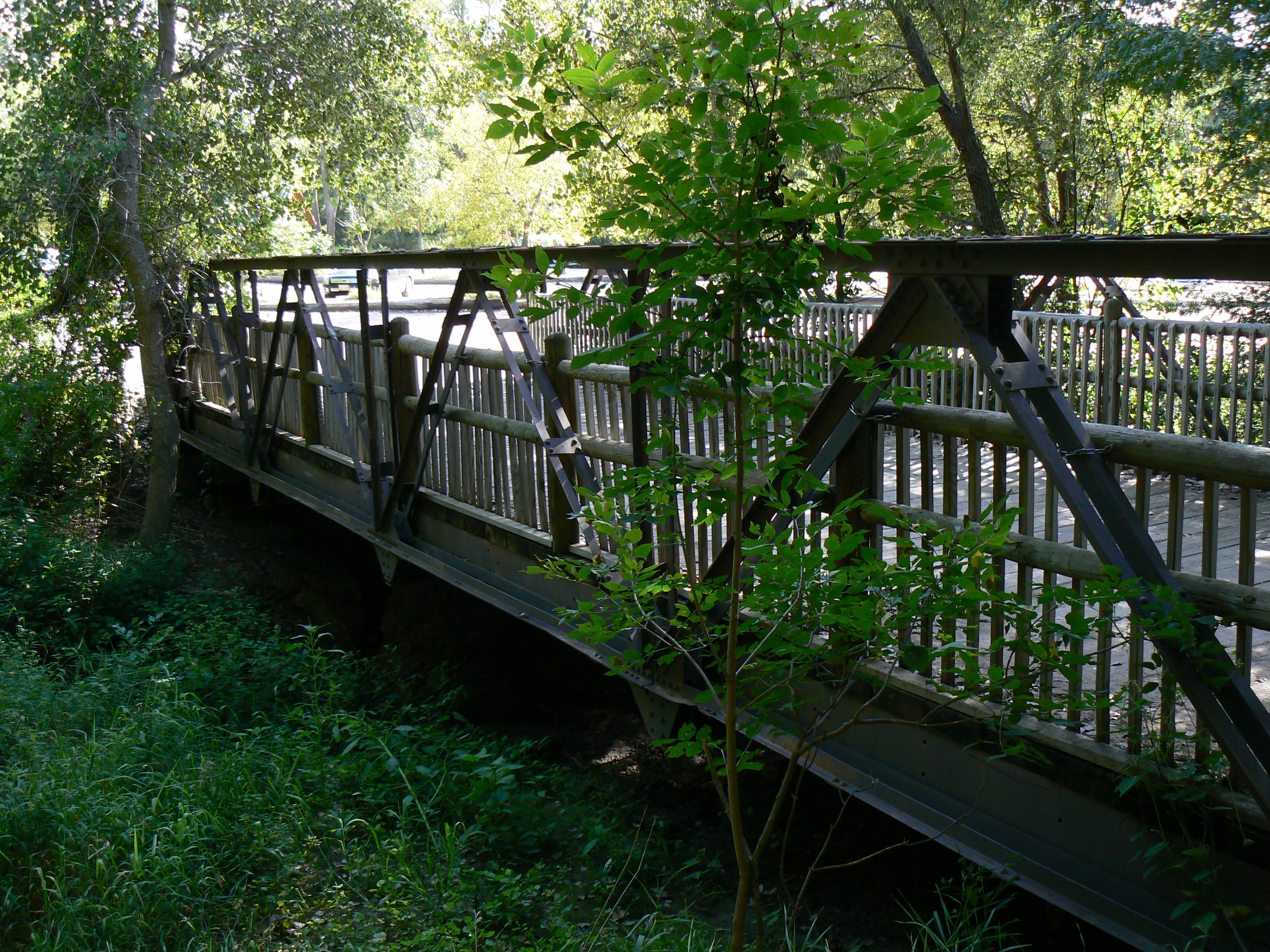
- Mynard Road Bridge

- Location within Nebraska Location within the United States
- Nearest city: Ashland, Nebraska
- Coordinates: 40°58′22″N 96°04′55″W
- Area: less than one acre
- Built: 1900
- Built by: J.R. Sheeley and Company
- Architectural style: Warren truss leg bedstead
- MPS: Highway Bridges in Nebraska MPS
- NRHP reference No.: 92000707
- Added to NRHP: June 29, 1992

The Mynard Road Bridge, now located near Ashland, Nebraska, is a historic Warren truss leg bedstead bridge that was built in 1900. It was probably built by J.R. Sheeley and Company, of Lincoln, Nebraska and was listed on the National Register of Historic Places in 1992. The 50-foot (15 m) Mynard Road Bridge was the longest of its engineering type remaining in the state of Nebraska when the historic inventory was done in 1992, and was still used for vehicular traffic at that time. The bridge was originally situated on the Maynard Road and was built to span an unnamed stream, 4.7 mi (7.6 km) southeast of Louisville, Nebraska. In 2000, the bridge was relocated to be used as a pedestrian bridge at the Lee G. Simmons Conservation Park and Wildlife Safari.

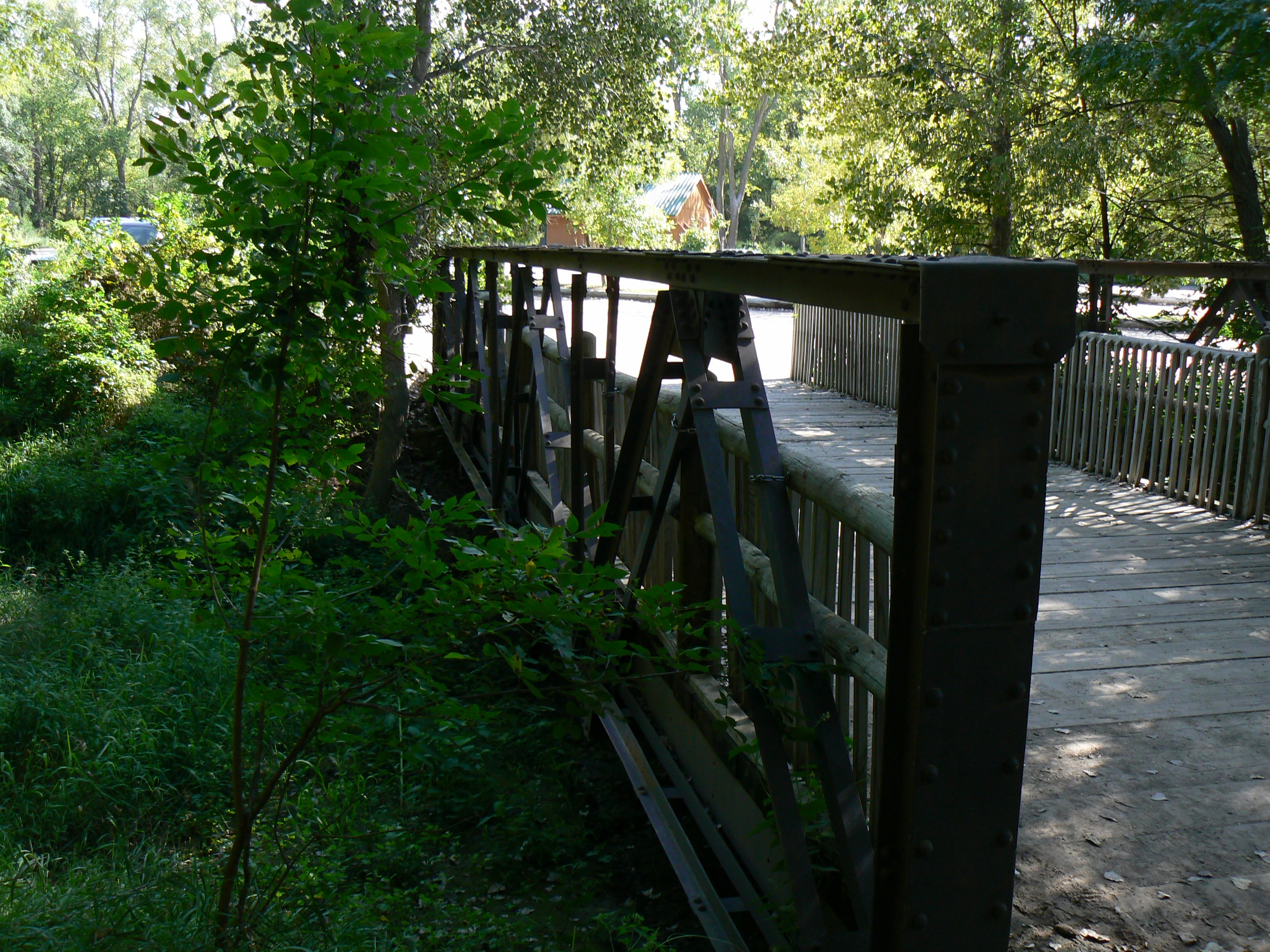
Detail of trusses

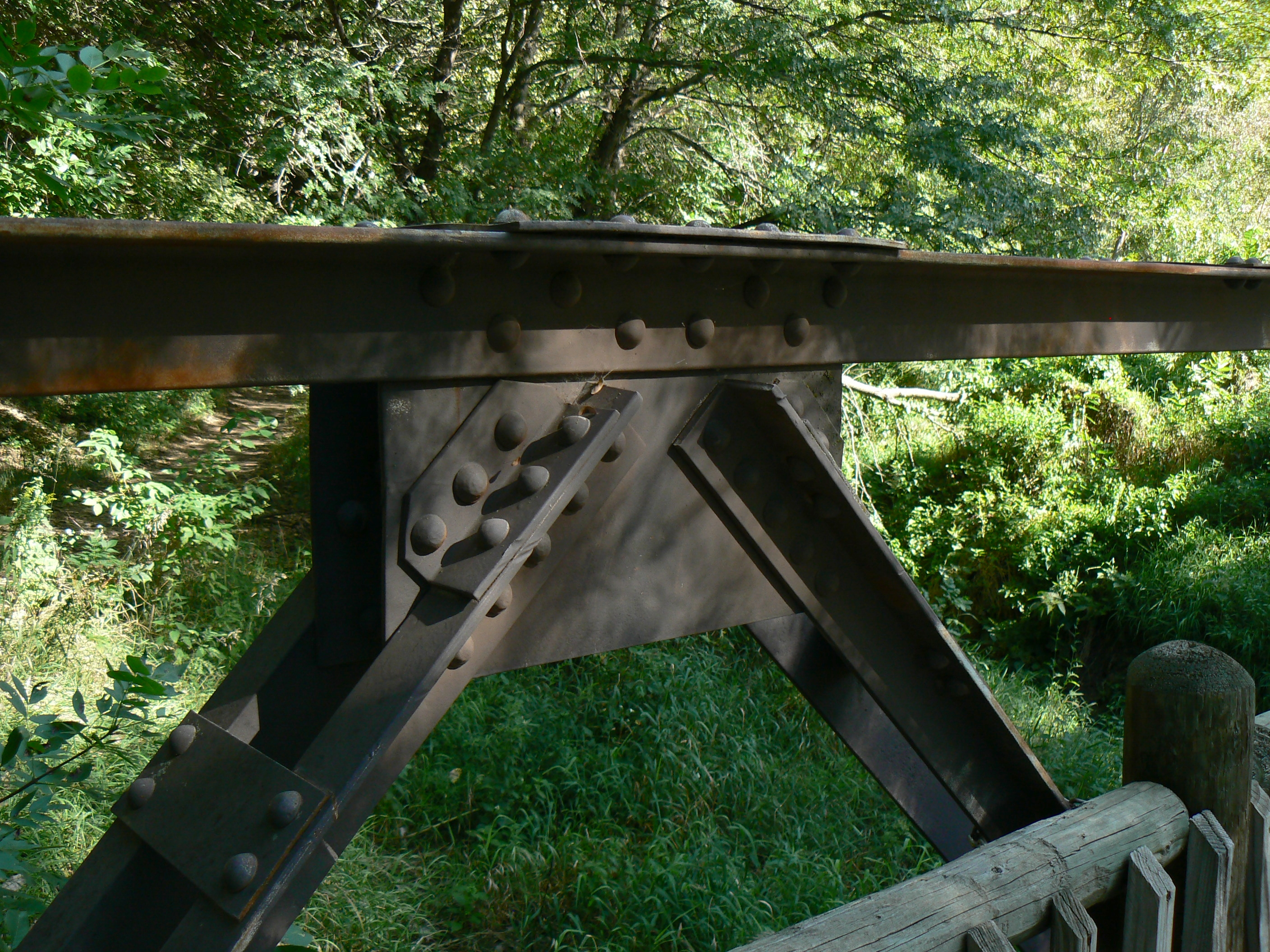
Top rivets on truss
