= Albert J. Dooley =

American politician (1930–2022)

Albert J. "A. J." Dooley

Member of the South Carolina House of Representatives for Lexington County
- In office 1959–1964

Member of the South Carolina Senate from the 8th district
- In office 1971–1976

Personal details
- Born: June 10, 1930 Chapin, South Carolina, U.S.
- Died: September 8, 2022 (aged 92) Lexington, South Carolina, U.S.
- Party: Democratic
- Education: University of South Carolina; University of South Carolina School of Law
- Occupation: Lawyer

Albert John Dooley (June 10, 1930 – September 8, 2022) was an American politician in the state of South Carolina. He served in the South Carolina Senate as a member of the Democratic Party from 1971 to 1976 and in the South Carolina House of Representatives from 1959 to 1964, representing Lexington County, South Carolina. Dooley was a lawyer. He died on September 8, 2022, at the age of 92.
