= Capt. John O'Rourke House =

- U.S. National Register of Historic Places
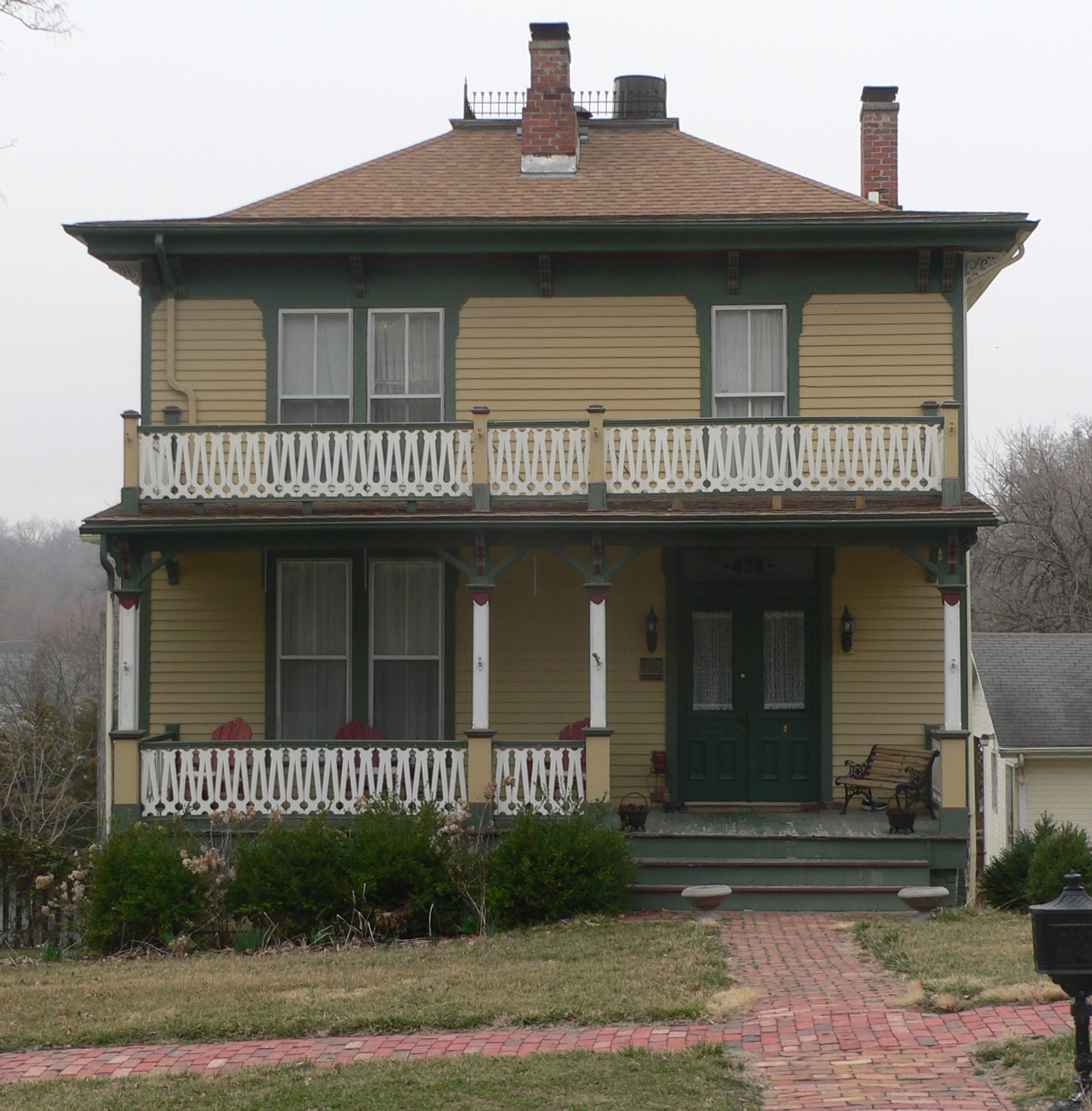

- Location within Nebraska
- Location: 424 N 6th St., Plattsmouth, Nebraska
- Coordinates: 41°00′54″N 95°53′11″W
- Area: less than one acre
- Built: 1881
- Architectural style: Italianate
- NRHP reference No.: 06000102
- Added to NRHP: March 2, 2006

The Capt. John O'Rourke House, at 424 N 6th St. in Plattsmouth, Nebraska, was built in 1881. It was listed on the National Register of Historic Places in 2006.

It is a two-story Italianate house, upon a full basement. It has a hipped roof with a deck with decorative iron cresting at the top of the roof. It has also been known as the Dugan House.

It is also significant for association with Captain John O'Rourke, who was born in Limerick, Ireland in 1834. He served as Captain of the 11th Wisconsin Light Artillery Battery in the American Civil War.

A "Captain John O'Rourke day" was declared by the City of Plattsmouth and held for the first time on June 10, 2006.
