= Les Mynard =

English footballer

Personal information
- Full name: Leslie Mynard
- Date of birth: 19 December 1925
- Place of birth: Bewdley, England
- Date of death: 25 July 2008 (aged 82)
- Place of death: Stourbridge, England
- Position: Left wing

Youth career
- Bewdley

Senior career*
Years	Team	Apps	(Gls)
1945–1949	Wolverhampton Wanderers	3	(0)
1949–1952	Derby County	14	(2)
1952–1953	Scunthorpe and Lindsey United	18	(3)
- Worcester City
- Halesowen Town
- Bromsgrove Rovers
- Kidderminster Harriers
- * Club domestic league appearances and goals

Leslie Mynard (19 December 1925 – 25 July 2008) was an English footballer who appeared in the Football League for Wolverhampton Wanderers, Derby County and Scunthorpe United.

Mynard joined Wolverhampton Wanderers in 1945 from non-league side Bewdley. He made his debut on 7 February 1948 in a 2–1 win over Huddersfield, the first of three consecutive starts for the winger. However, these proved his only taste of first-team action at Molineux, and he moved to Derby County in May 1949.

He found playing time equally scarce at his new club, though, and made just 14 appearances in three years. He moved to Third Division Scunthorpe and Lindsey United for the 1952-53 season before dropping into the non-league. He finished his playing career with spells at Worcester City, Halesowen Town, Bromsgrove Rovers and Kidderminster Harriers, respectively.

He died on 25 July 2008, aged 82.
