= Mynard, Nebraska =

Unincorporated community in Nebraska, United States

Mynard
- Unincorporated community
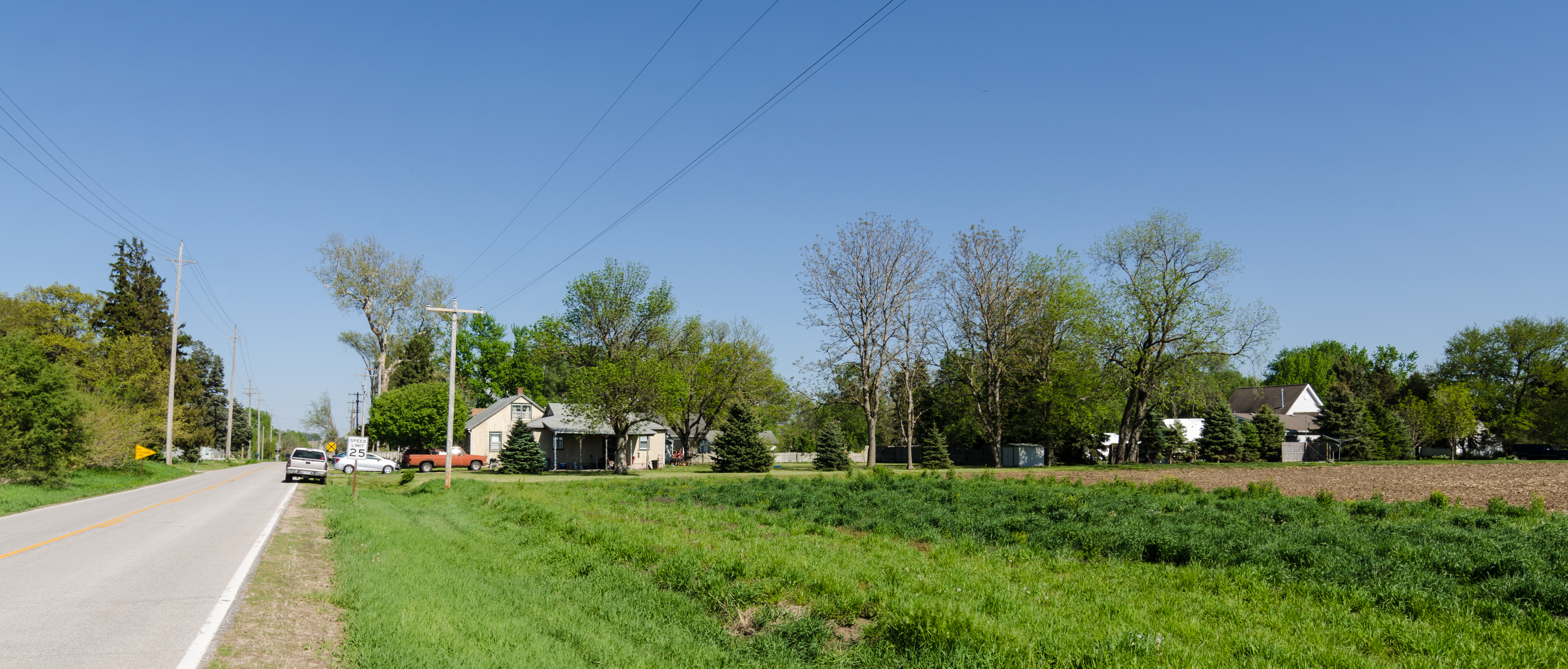
- East on Mynard Road

- Location within the state of Nebraska
- Country: United States
- State: Nebraska
- County: Cass
- Elevation: 1,089 ft (332 m)
- Time zone: UTC-6 (Central (CST))
  - Summer (DST): UTC-5 (CDT)
- ZIP codes: 68048
- GNIS feature ID: 831551

Mynard is an unincorporated community in Cass County, Nebraska, United States.

== History ==
A post office was established at Mynard in 1894, which remained in operation until it was discontinued in 1939. Mynard was named for Mynard Lewis, a railroad employee.
