= Murdock, Nebraska =

- Village
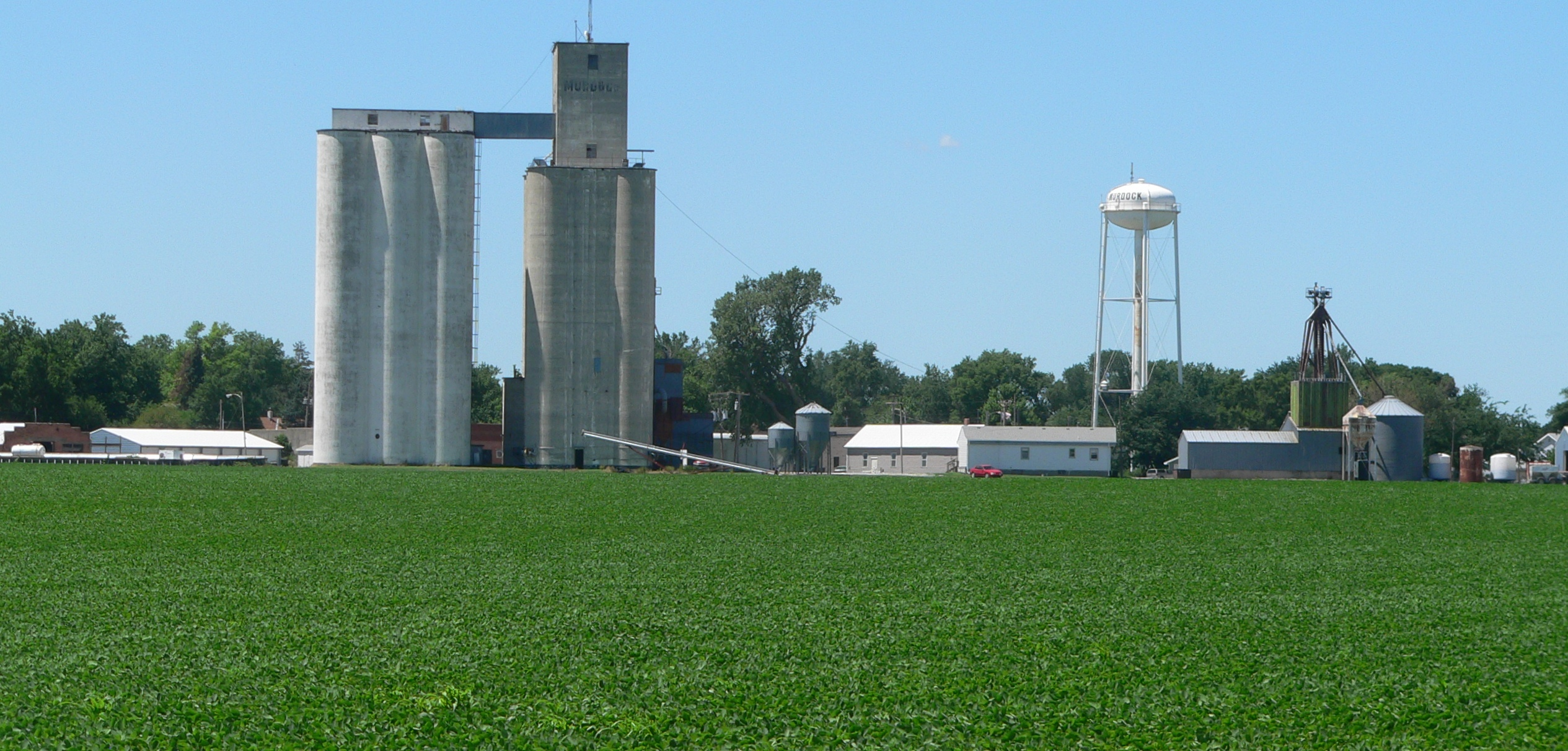
- Murdock, seen from the southeast.

- Location of Murdock, Nebraska
- Coordinates: 40°55′34″N 96°16′51″W
- Country: United States
- State: Nebraska
- County: Cass

Area
  - Total: 0.13 sq mi (0.33 km^{2})
  - Land: 0.13 sq mi (0.33 km^{2})
  - Water: 0 sq mi (0.00 km^{2})
- Elevation: 1,283 ft (391 m)

Population (2020)
  - Total: 270
  - Density: 2,090.1/sq mi (807.01/km^{2})
- Time zone: UTC-6 (Central (CST))
  - Summer (DST): UTC-5 (CDT)
- ZIP code: 68407
- Area code: 402
- FIPS code: 31-33320
- GNIS feature ID: 2399429
- Website: http://www.MurdockNebraska.com

Murdock is a village in Cass County, Nebraska, United States. The population was 270 according to the 2020 census.

== History ==
Murdock was established circa 1890 when the Chicago, Rock Island and Pacific Railroad was extended to that point. Murdock was named after a Rock Island Railroad official.

== Geography ==
According to the United States Census Bureau, the village has a total area of 0.13 square miles (0.34 km^{2}), all land.

== Demographics ==
Historical population
Census	Pop.	Note	%±
1910	222		—
1920	206		−7.2%
1930	233		13.1%
1940	199		−14.6%
1950	225		13.1%
1960	247		9.8%
1970	262		6.1%
1980	242		−7.6%
1990	267		10.3%
2000	269		0.7%
2010	236		−12.3%
2020	270		14.4%
U.S. Decennial Census

=== 2000 census ===
As of the census of 2000, there were 269 people, 110 households, and 75 families living in the village. The population density was 2,231.5 inhabitants per square mile (861.6/km^{2}). There were 117 housing units at an average density of 970.6 per square mile (374.8/km^{2}). The racial makeup of the village was 98.51% White, 0.37% Native American, 0.37% Asian, and 0.74% from two or more races.

There were 110 households, out of which 30.9% had children under the age of 18 living with them, 57.3% were married couples living together, 8.2% had a female householder with no husband present, and 31.8% were non-families. 28.2% of all households were made up of individuals, and 18.2% had someone living alone who was 65 years of age or older. The average household size was 2.45 and the average family size was 3.05.

In the village, the population was spread out, with 28.3% under the age of 18, 5.6% from 18 to 24, 25.3% from 25 to 44, 24.9% from 45 to 64, and 16.0% who were 65 years of age or older. The median age was 39 years. For every 100 females, there were 94.9 males. For every 100 females age 18 and over, there were 82.1 males.

As of 2000 the median income for a household in the village was $35,781, and the median income for a family was $45,357. Males had a median income of $36,875 versus $22,031 for females. The per capita income for the village was $16,766. About 2.3% of families and 2.5% of the population were below the poverty line, including 3.8% of those under the age of eighteen and none of those 65 or over.

=== 2010 census ===
As of the census of 2010, there were 236 people, 109 households, and 66 families living in the village. The population density was 1,815.4 inhabitants per square mile (700.9/km^{2}). There were 118 housing units at an average density of 907.7 per square mile (350.5/km^{2}). The racial makeup of the village was 99.2% White and 0.8% Native American. Hispanic or Latino of any race were 1.3% of the population.

There were 109 households, of which 23.9% had children under the age of 18 living with them, 51.4% were married couples living together, 7.3% had a female householder with no husband present, 1.8% had a male householder with no wife present, and 39.4% were non-families. 32.1% of all households were made up of individuals, and 13.8% had someone living alone who was 65 years of age or older. The average household size was 2.17 and the average family size was 2.73.

The median age in the village was 44 years. 18.2% of residents were under the age of 18; 6.3% were between the ages of 18 and 24; 25.9% were from 25 to 44; 32.6% were from 45 to 64; and 16.9% were 65 years of age or older. The gender makeup of the village was 52.1% male and 47.9% female.
