= Weeping Water, Nebraska =

- City
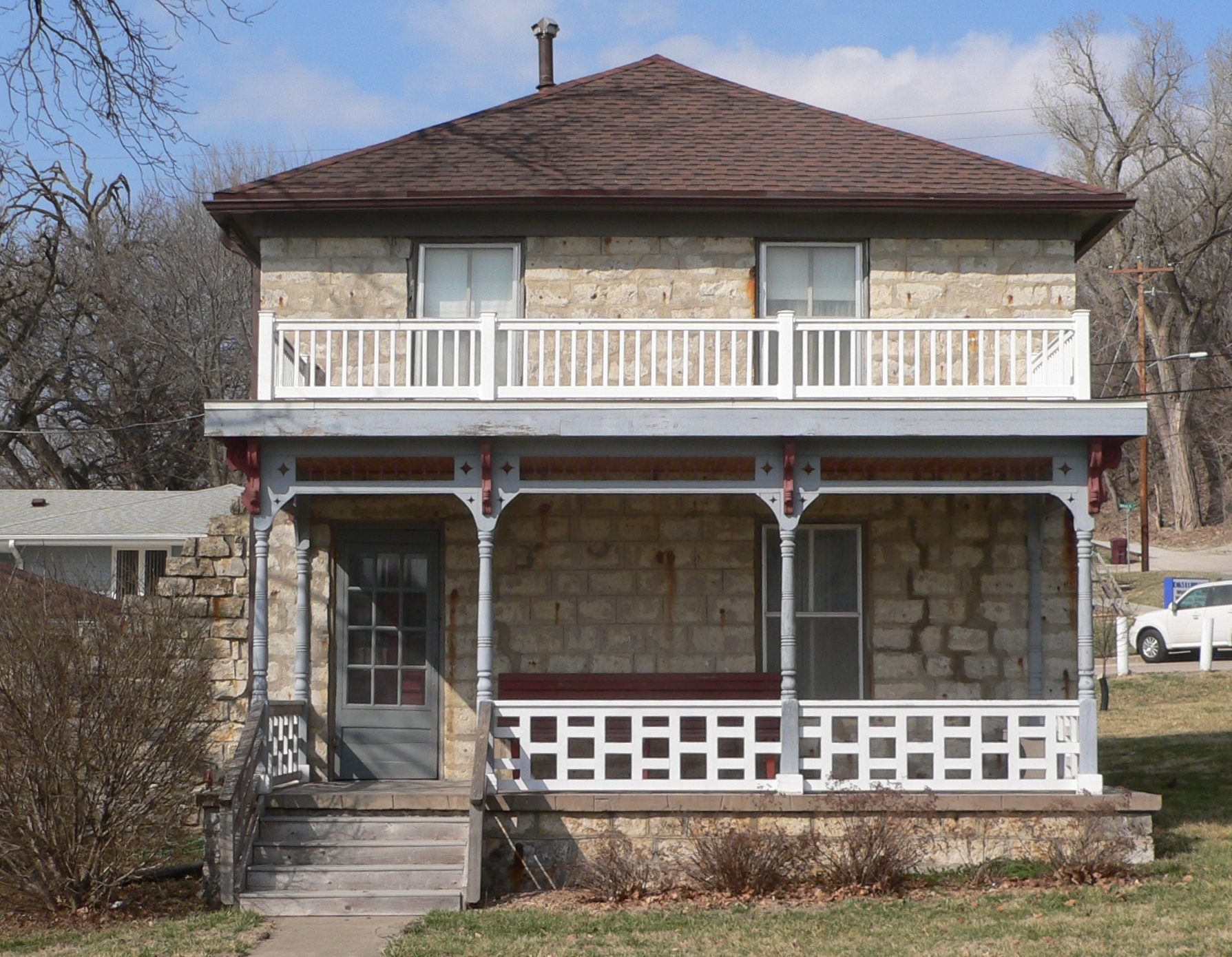
- The Heritage House Museum is part of the Weeping Water Historic District, listed in the National Register of Historic Places.

- Location of Weeping Water, Nebraska
- Coordinates: 40°52′09″N 96°08′25″W
- Country: United States
- State: Nebraska
- County: Cass

Area
  - Total: 0.99 sq mi (2.56 km^{2})
  - Land: 0.99 sq mi (2.56 km^{2})
  - Water: 0 sq mi (0.00 km^{2})
- Elevation: 1,083 ft (330 m)

Population (2020)
  - Total: 1,029
  - Density: 1,041.6/sq mi (402.16/km^{2})
- Time zone: UTC−6 (Central (CST))
  - Summer (DST): UTC−5 (CDT)
- ZIP Code: 68463
- Area code: 402
- FIPS code: 31-52015
- GNIS feature ID: 2397243
- Website: weepingwaternebraska.com

Weeping Water is a city in Cass County, Nebraska, United States. The population was 1,029 at the 2020 census.

== History ==
The name of the stream running through Weeping Water is Nigahoe in Oto and Omaha, meaning "rustling water," in reference to the sound of the water running over the low falls. This was mistaken by the French to be Nihoage, meaning "water weeping." This error was recorded in French as L'Eau qui Pleure, meaning "the water that weeps." This was later translated into English as its current name, Weeping Water. The village of Nehawka, also in Cass County, is an anglicization of Nigahoe, the original name of the stream in Weeping Water.

Weeping Water was platted in 1867. Weeping Water was incorporated as a village in 1870, and as a city in 1888.

=== Legend ===
Debates over the origin of the name have existed since at least the early twentieth century. Regardless of whether the legend originates from Native American sources or was simply created to explain the mistranslation of the Native American name for the stream, the legend has become an important piece of Nebraska folklore.

According to American folklorist Louise Pound, the first written reference to the legend of Weeping Water is found in the 800-line poem "The Weeping Water" by Orsamus Charles Dake, published in a book of poetry called Nebraska Legends and Other Poems in 1871. Dake's poem is prefaced with a disclaimer that "The Weeping Water" was one of two poems that Dake "developed."

Dake's poem is also preceded by a paragraph summarizing the legend which reads:

The Omaha and Otoe Indians, being at war, chanced to meet on their common hunting ground south of the Platte River in Nebraska. A fierce battle ensued, in which all the male warriors of both tribes being slain, the women and children came upon the battle-field and sat down and wept. From the fountain of their tears arose and ever flows the little stream known as the Ne-hawka or the Weeping Water.

The poem includes details and dialogue that Dake likely invented, such as the main narrative thrust of the poem, a story of forbidden love between an Otoe man and the daughter of the Omaha chief. According to Pound, the words spoken by the characters in the poem are not so much dialogue but rather "[l]ofty speeches of the Homeric and Virgilian type" which Pound attributes to Dake's classical training and tenure as an English professor. Pound suggests that it is most likely, based on the preface and summary he provides with the poem, that Dake took inspiration from a preexisting folktale, though whether the legend was genuinely of Native American origin remains undetermined.

== Geography ==
According to the United States Census Bureau, the city has a total area of 0.97 square miles (2.51 km^{2}), all land.

=== Climate ===
Climate data for Weeping Water, Nebraska (1991–2020)
Month	Jan	Feb	Mar	Apr	May	Jun	Jul	Aug	Sep	Oct	Nov	Dec	Year
Mean daily maximum °F (°C)	34.0 (1.1)	39.2 (4.0)	52.2 (11.2)	63.8 (17.7)	73.5 (23.1)	82.5 (28.1)	85.9 (29.9)	83.5 (28.6)	77.3 (25.2)	64.8 (18.2)	50.3 (10.2)	38.0 (3.3)	62.1 (16.7)
Daily mean °F (°C)	23.8 (−4.6)	28.5 (−1.9)	40.4 (4.7)	51.7 (10.9)	62.4 (16.9)	72.1 (22.3)	76.1 (24.5)	73.5 (23.1)	65.8 (18.8)	53.2 (11.8)	39.0 (3.9)	28.0 (−2.2)	51.2 (10.7)
Mean daily minimum °F (°C)	13.7 (−10.2)	17.8 (−7.9)	28.6 (−1.9)	39.6 (4.2)	51.3 (10.7)	61.6 (16.4)	66.2 (19.0)	63.5 (17.5)	54.3 (12.4)	41.6 (5.3)	27.8 (−2.3)	18.0 (−7.8)	40.3 (4.6)
Average precipitation inches (mm)	0.92 (23)	1.08 (27)	1.85 (47)	3.28 (83)	5.25 (133)	5.27 (134)	4.06 (103)	3.35 (85)	2.95 (75)	2.77 (70)	1.46 (37)	1.36 (35)	33.6 (852)
Average snowfall inches (cm)	10.0 (25)	7.8 (20)	3.6 (9.1)	1.5 (3.8)	0.0 (0.0)	0.0 (0.0)	0.0 (0.0)	0.0 (0.0)	0.0 (0.0)	1.1 (2.8)	1.4 (3.6)	7.4 (19)	32.8 (83.3)
Source: NOAA

== Demographics ==
Historical population
Census	Pop.	Note	%±
1880	317		—
1890	1,350		325.9%
1900	1,156		−14.4%
1910	1,067		−7.7%
1920	1,084		1.6%
1930	1,029		−5.1%
1940	1,139		10.7%
1950	1,070		−6.1%
1960	1,048		−2.1%
1970	1,143		9.1%
1980	1,109		−3.0%
1990	1,008		−9.1%
2000	1,003		−0.5%
2010	1,050		4.7%
2020	1,029		−2.0%
U.S. Decennial Census

=== 2010 census ===
As of the census of 2010, there were 1,050 people, 427 households, and 274 families living in the city. The population density was 1,082.5 inhabitants per square mile (418.0/km^{2}). There were 466 housing units at an average density of 480.4 per square mile (185.5/km^{2}). The racial makeup of the city was 98.8% White, 0.2% African American, 0.1% Native American, 0.1% Asian, 0.1% from other races, and 0.8% from two or more races. Hispanics or Latinos of any race were 0.7% of the population.

There were 427 households, of which 34.0% had children under the age of 18 living with them, 51.8% were married couples living together, 8.0% had a female householder with no husband present, 4.4% had a male householder with no wife present, and 35.8% were non-families. 29.7% of all households were made up of individuals, and 14.3% had someone living alone who was 65 years of age or older. The average household size was 2.46 and the average family size was 3.08.

The median age in the city was 38 years. 26.3% of residents were under the age of 18; 7.2% were between the ages of 18 and 24; 25.4% were from 25 to 44; 28.1% were from 45 to 64; and 13% were 65 years of age or older. The gender makeup of the city was 49.0% male and 51.0% female.

=== 2000 census ===
As of the census of 2000, there were 1,003 people, 434 households, and 293 families living in the city. The population density was 1,254.8 inhabitants per square mile (484.5/km^{2}). There were 465 housing units at an average density of 529.0 per square mile (204.2/km^{2}). The racial makeup of the city was 99.09% White, 0.09% Native American, 0.09% Pacific Islander, and 0.73% from two or more races. Hispanics or Latinos of any race were 0.54% of the population.

There were 434 households, out of which 34.1% had children under the age of 18 living with them, 56.7% were married couples living together, 7.4% had a female householder with no husband present, and 32.3% were non-families. 29.3% of all households were made up of individuals, and 14.7% had someone living alone who was 65 years of age or older. The average household size was 2.54 and the average family size was 3.15.

In the city, the population was spread out, with 27.5% under the age of 18, 8.8% from 18 to 24, 26.8% from 25 to 44, 21.8% from 45 to 64, and 15.1% who were 65 years of age or older. The median age was 37 years. For every 100 females, there were 89.8 males. For every 100 females age 18 and over, there were 90.9 males.

As of 2000 the median income for a household in the city was $42,692, and the median income for a family was $51,250. Males had a median income of $37,656 versus $21,354 for females. The per capita income for the city was $18,674. About 5.1% of families and 7.4% of the population were below the poverty line, including 9.7% of those under age 18 and 7.9% of those age 65 or over.

== Culture ==
Weeping Water is best known for its limestone quarry. Every year, late in June, the town celebrates Limestone Day with a parade, fireworks and games.
