= Manley, Nebraska =

- Village
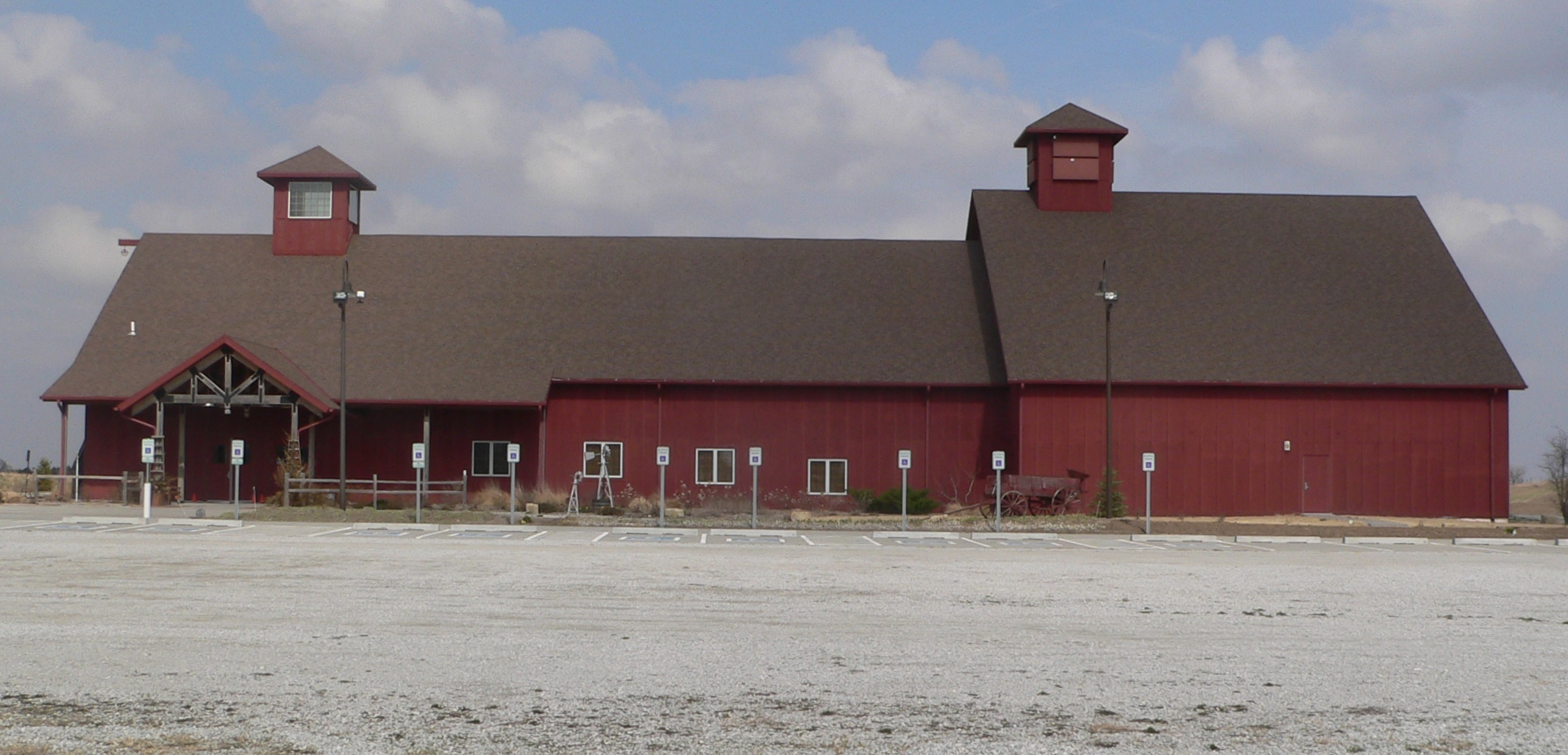
- Lofte Community Theatre, on the eastern outskirts of Manley.

- Location of Manley, Nebraska
- Coordinates: 40°55′06″N 96°09′57″W
- Country: United States
- State: Nebraska
- County: Cass

Area
  - Total: 0.11 sq mi (0.29 km^{2})
  - Land: 0.11 sq mi (0.29 km^{2})
  - Water: 0 sq mi (0.00 km^{2})
- Elevation: 1,293 ft (394 m)

Population (2020)
  - Total: 167
  - Density: 1,480.3/sq mi (571.55/km^{2})
- Time zone: UTC-6 (Central (CST))
  - Summer (DST): UTC-5 (CDT)
- ZIP code: 68403
- Area code: 402
- FIPS code: 31-30415
- GNIS feature ID: 2399242
- Website: https://ManleyNebraska.com

Manley is a village in Cass County, Nebraska, United States. The population was 167 at the 2020 census.

== History ==
Manley was established in 1883 when the Missouri Pacific Railroad was extended to that point. An early variant name was "Summit". The present name "Manley" likely was named after a local cattleman. The village incorporated in 1954.

== Geography ==
According to the United States Census Bureau, the village has a total area of 0.09 square miles (0.23 km^{2}), all land.

== Demographics ==
Historical population
Census	Pop.	Note	%±
1960	113		—
1970	150		32.7%
1980	124		−17.3%
1990	170		37.1%
2000	191		12.4%
2010	178		−6.8%
2020	167		−6.2%
U.S. Decennial Census

=== 2010 census ===
As of the census of 2010, there were 178 people, 66 households, and 48 families living in the village. The population density was 1,977.8 inhabitants per square mile (763.6/km^{2}). There were 67 housing units at an average density of 744.4 per square mile (287.4/km^{2}). The racial makeup of the village was 97.2% White, 0.6% from other races, and 2.2% from two or more races. Hispanic or Latino of any race were 0.6% of the population.

There were 66 households, of which 33.3% had children under the age of 18 living with them, 66.7% were married couples living together, 4.5% had a female householder with no husband present, 1.5% had a male householder with no wife present, and 27.3% were non-families. 21.2% of all households were made up of individuals, and 10.6% had someone living alone who was 65 years of age or older. The average household size was 2.70 and the average family size was 3.13.

The median age in the village was 43.5 years. 26.4% of residents were under the age of 18; 5.6% were between the ages of 18 and 24; 19.2% were from 25 to 44; 36% were from 45 to 64; and 12.9% were 65 years of age or older. The gender makeup of the village was 50.0% male and 50.0% female.

=== 2000 census ===
As of the census of 2000, there were 191 people, 69 households, and 52 families living in the village. The population density was 2,141.6 inhabitants per square mile (826.9/km^{2}). There were 71 housing units at an average density of 796.1 per square mile (307.4/km^{2}). The racial makeup of the village was 96.86% White, and 3.14% from two or more races. Hispanic or Latino of any race were 0.52% of the population.

There were 69 households, out of which 40.6% had children under the age of 18 living with them, 59.4% were married couples living together, 13.0% had a female householder with no husband present, and 24.6% were non-families. 18.8% of all households were made up of individuals, and 7.2% had someone living alone who was 65 years of age or older. The average household size was 2.77 and the average family size was 3.17.

In the village, the population was spread out, with 33.0% under the age of 18, 4.7% from 18 to 24, 34.6% from 25 to 44, 18.3% from 45 to 64, and 9.4% who were 65 years of age or older. The median age was 34 years. For every 100 females, there were 85.4 males. For every 100 females age 18 and over, there were 85.5 males.

As of 2000 the median income for a household in the village was $43,750, and the median income for a family was $52,500. Males had a median income of $33,750 versus $21,750 for females. The per capita income for the village was $16,398. About 6.3% of families and 5.9% of the population were below the poverty line, including 10.2% of those under the age of eighteen and none of those 65 or over.
