= Louisville, Nebraska =

- City
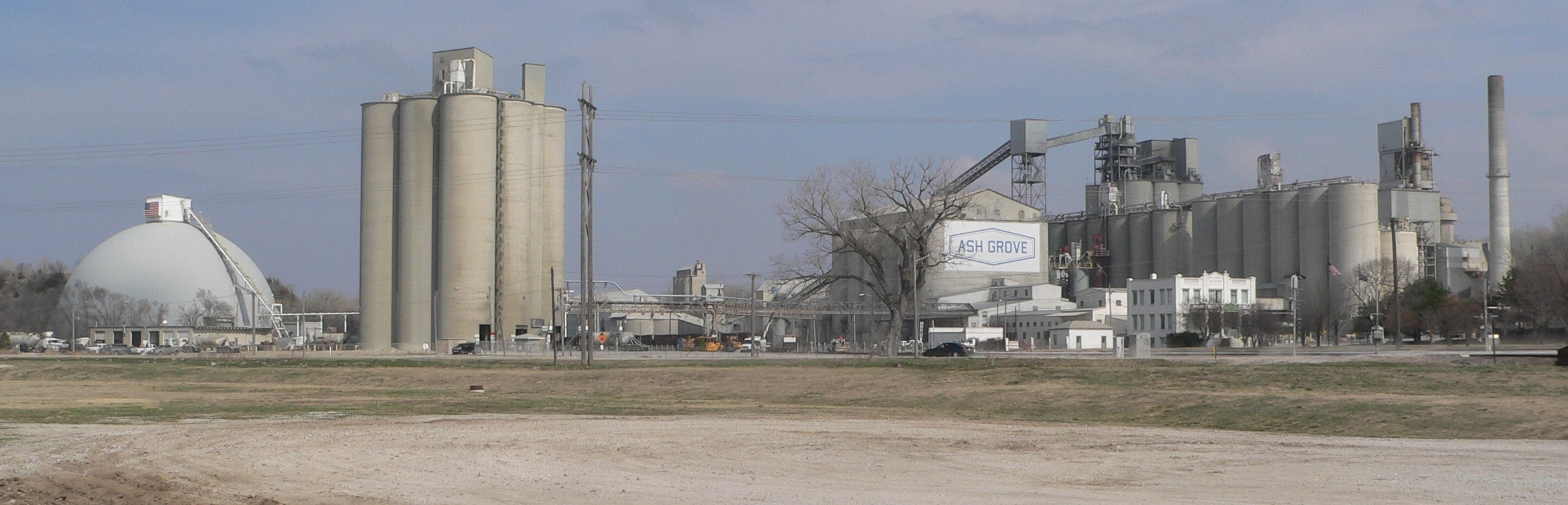
- Ash Grove cement plant in Louisville

- Location of Louisville, Nebraska
- Coordinates: 40°59′47″N 96°09′40″W
- Country: United States
- State: Nebraska
- County: Cass

Area
  - Total: 0.65 sq mi (1.68 km^{2})
  - Land: 0.65 sq mi (1.68 km^{2})
  - Water: 0 sq mi (0.00 km^{2})
- Elevation: 1,040 ft (320 m)

Population (2020)
  - Total: 1,319
  - Density: 2,031/sq mi (784.3/km^{2})
- Time zone: UTC-6 (Central (CST))
  - Summer (DST): UTC-5 (CDT)
- ZIP code: 68037
- Area code: 402
- FIPS code: 31-29260
- GNIS feature ID: 2395772
- Website: https://www.louisvillenebraska.com

Louisville is a city in northern Cass County, Nebraska, United States. The population was 1,319 at the 2020 census.

== History ==
The first permanent settlement at Louisville was made in 1857. Louisville was platted in about 1870 when the Burlington & Missouri River Railroad was extended to that point. The community was likely named after the city of Louisville, Kentucky. A folk etymology maintains the name Louisville is derived from one Mr. Lois, the proprietor of a local gristmill. The current mayor of Louisville is Rodney Petersen, a lifelong resident of the city.

== Geography ==
According to the United States Census Bureau, the city has a total area of 0.57 square miles (1.48 km^{2}), all land.

== Demographics ==
Historical population
Census	Pop.	Note	%±
1880	321		—
1890	653		103.4%
1900	738		13.0%
1910	778		5.4%
1920	645		−17.1%
1930	969		50.2%
1940	977		0.8%
1950	1,014		3.8%
1960	1,194		17.8%
1970	1,036		−13.2%
1980	1,022		−1.4%
1990	998		−2.3%
2000	1,046		4.8%
2010	1,106		5.7%
2020	1,319		19.3%
U.S. Decennial Census

=== 2010 census ===
As of the census of 2010, there were 1,106 people, 477 households, and 298 families living in the city. The population density was 1,940.4 inhabitants per square mile (749.2/km^{2}). There were 515 housing units at an average density of 903.5 units per square mile (348.8 units/km^{2}). The racial makeup of the city was 96.7% White, 0.5% African American, 0.5% Native American, 0.1% Asian, 0.3% from other races, and 1.9% from two or more races. Hispanic or Latino of any race were 1.4% of the population.

There were 477 households, of which 31.9% had children under the age of 18 living with them, 50.1% were married couples living together, 9.0% had a female householder with no husband present, 3.4% had a male householder with no wife present, and 37.5% were non-families. 33.5% of all households were made up of individuals, and 19.1% had someone living alone who was 65 years of age or older. The average household size was 2.32 and the average family size was 2.98.

The median age in the city was 37.4 years. 25% of residents were under the age of 18; 8% were between the ages of 18 and 24; 26.1% were from 25 to 44; 25.4% were from 45 to 64; and 15.4% were 65 years of age or older. The gender makeup of the city was 49.0% male and 51.0% female.

=== 2000 census ===
As of the census of 2000, there were 1,046 people, 436 households, and 286 families living in the city. The population density was 2,037.6 inhabitants per square mile (786.7/km^{2}). There were 456 housing units at an average density of 888.3 units per square mile (343.0 units/km^{2}). The racial makeup of the city was 98.66% White, 0.48% Asian, 0.10% Pacific Islander, 0.29% from other races, and 0.48% from two or more races. Hispanic or Latino of any race were 1.91% of the population.

There were 436 households, out of which 34.6% had children under the age of 18 living with them, 53.0% were married couples living together, 9.4% had a female householder with no husband present, and 34.2% were non-families. 29.4% of all households were made up of individuals, and 11.9% had someone living alone who was 65 years of age or older. The average household size was 2.40 and the average family size was 2.99.

In the city, the population was spread out, with 27.3% under the age of 18, 7.4% from 18 to 24, 33.4% from 25 to 44, 18.6% from 45 to 64, and 13.3% who were 65 years of age or older. The median age was 35 years. For every 100 females, there were 98.1 males. For every 100 females age 18 and over, there were 93.4 males.

As of 2000 the median income for a household in the city was $40,875, and the median income for a family was $46,346. Males had a median income of $35,714 versus $27,031 for females. The per capita income for the city was $19,308. About 2.1% of families and 3.7% of the population were below the poverty line, including 4.6% of those under age 18 and 4.7% of those age 65 or over.
