= Cass County, Nebraska =

County in Nebraska, United States

- County
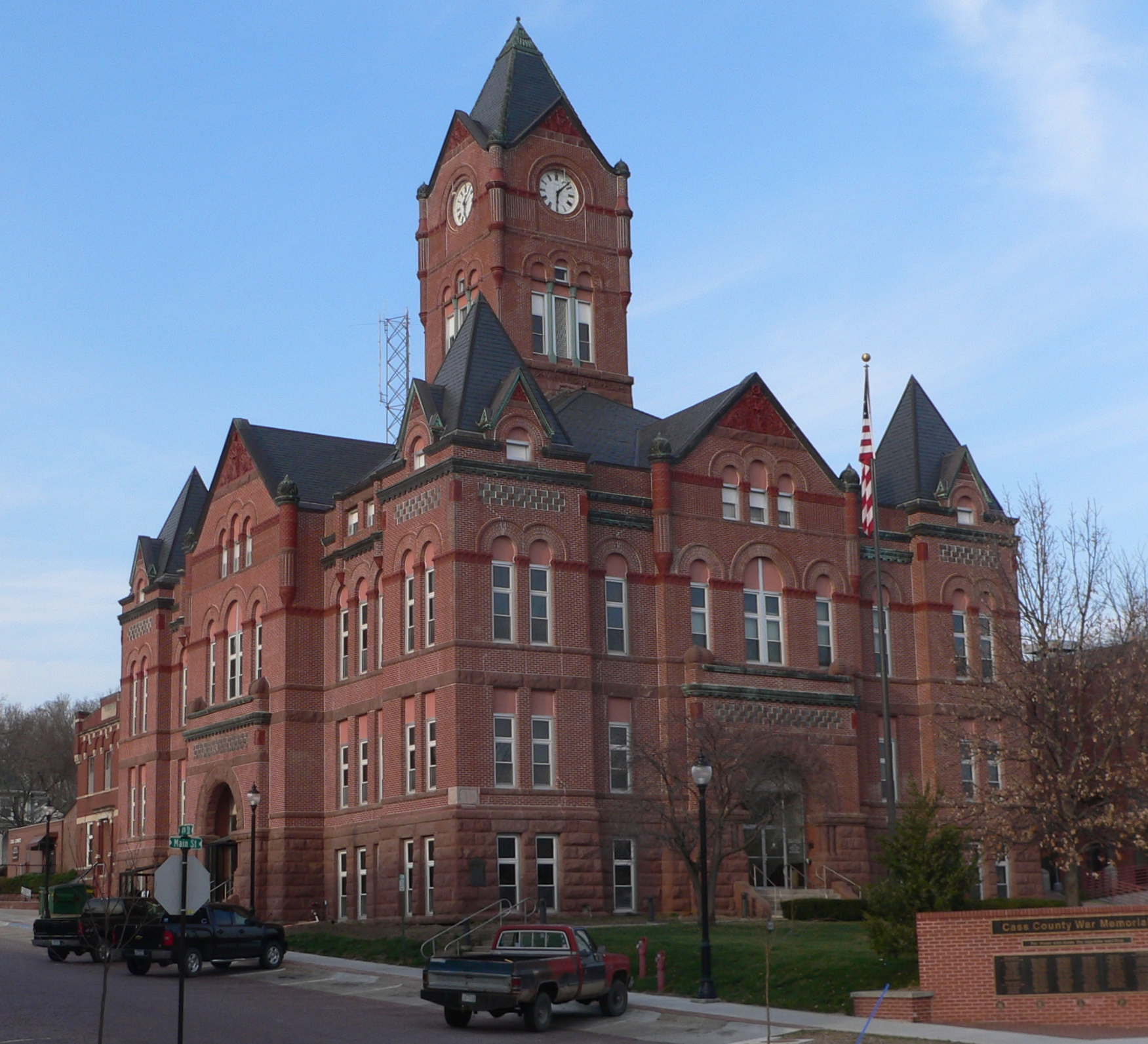
- The Cass County Courthouse in Plattsmouth

- Location within the U.S. state of Nebraska
- Coordinates: 40.909878°N 96.140609°W
- Country: United States
- State: Nebraska
- Founded: November 23, 1854
- Named for: Lewis Cass
- Seat: Plattsmouth
- Largest city: Plattsmouth

Area
  - Total: 565.891 sq mi (1,465.65 km^{2})
  - Land: 556.911 sq mi (1,442.39 km^{2})
  - Water: 8.980 sq mi (23.26 km^{2}) 1.59%

Population (2020)
  - Total: 26,598
  - Estimate (2025): 27,657 ▲
  - Density: 47.760/sq mi (18.440/km^{2})
- Time zone: UTC−6 (Central)
  - Summer (DST): UTC−5 (CDT)
- Area code: 402 and 531
- Congressional district: 1st
- Website: casscountyne.gov
- • Nebraska county number 13 • Nebraska license plate prefix 20

Cass County is a county in the U.S. state of Nebraska. As of the 2020 census, the population was 26,598. and was estimated to be 27,657 in 2025. The county seat and the largest city is Plattsmouth.

Cass County is included in the Omaha–Council Bluffs metropolitan area.

In the Nebraska license plate system, Cass County was represented by the prefix "20" (as it had the 20th-largest number of vehicles registered in the state when the license plate system was established in 1922).

== History ==
Cass County was created on November 23, 1854, and was named for General Lewis Cass, an American military officer, politician, and statesman.

== Geography ==
Cass County lies on the east side of Nebraska. Its east boundary line abuts the west boundary line of the state of Iowa, across the Missouri River.

According to the United States Census Bureau, the county has a total area of 565.891 square miles (1,465.65 km^{2}), of which 556.911 square miles (1,442.39 km^{2}) is land and 8.980 square miles (23.26 km^{2}) (1.59%) is water. It is the 67th-largest county in Nebraska by total area.

=== Major highways ===
- Interstate 80
- U.S. Highway 6
- U.S. Highway 34
- U.S. Highway 75
- Nebraska Highway 1
- Nebraska Highway 43
- Nebraska Highway 50
- Nebraska Highway 63
- Nebraska Highway 66
- Nebraska Highway 67

=== Protected areas ===
- Beaver Lake
- Louisville State Recreation Area
- Eugene T. Mahoney State Park
- Platte River State Park
- Schilling Wildlife Management Area

=== Adjacent counties ===
- Sarpy County – north
- Mills County, Iowa – northeast
- Fremont County, Iowa – southeast
- Otoe County – south
- Lancaster County – west
- Saunders County – northwest

Due to its proximity to Cass County, Iowa, and because both of those counties receive most of their broadcasts from Omaha, Nebraska, references to 'Cass County' must be frequently disambiguated, or result in confusion.

== Demographics ==
Historical population
Census	Pop.	Note	%±
1860	3,369		—
1870	8,151		141.9%
1880	16,683		104.7%
1890	24,080		44.3%
1900	21,330		−11.4%
1910	19,786		−7.2%
1920	18,029		−8.9%
1930	17,684		−1.9%
1940	16,992		−3.9%
1950	16,361		−3.7%
1960	17,821		8.9%
1970	18,076		1.4%
1980	20,297		12.3%
1990	21,318		5.0%
2000	24,334		14.1%
2010	25,241		3.7%
2020	26,598		5.4%
2025 (est.)	27,657	▲	4.0%
U.S. Decennial Census; 1790–1960 1900–1990; 1990–2000 2010–2020

=== 2020 census ===
As of the 2020 census, the county had a population of 26,598. The median age was 42.4 years. 23.9% of residents were under the age of 18 and 18.6% of residents were 65 years of age or older. For every 100 females there were 102.4 males, and for every 100 females age 18 and over there were 100.4 males age 18 and over.

The racial makeup of the county was 92.6% White, 0.4% Black or African American, 0.4% American Indian and Alaska Native, 0.4% Asian, 0.0% Native Hawaiian and Pacific Islander, 1.2% from some other race, and 5.0% from two or more races. Hispanic or Latino residents of any race comprised 3.7% of the population.

25.0% of residents lived in urban areas, while 75.0% lived in rural areas.

There were 10,315 households in the county, of which 30.8% had children under the age of 18 living with them and 17.8% had a female householder with no spouse or partner present. About 23.2% of all households were made up of individuals and 10.9% had someone living alone who was 65 years of age or older.

There were 11,623 housing units, of which 11.3% were vacant. Among occupied housing units, 82.9% were owner-occupied and 17.1% were renter-occupied. The homeowner vacancy rate was 1.2% and the rental vacancy rate was 7.5%.

=== 2010 census ===
As of the 2010 census, there were 25,241 people, 9,698 households and 7,078 families. The population density was 45 people per square mile (17 people/km^{2}). There were 11,117 housing units at an average density of 20 units per square mile (7.7/km^{2}). The racial makeup of the county was 89.3% White, 0.7% Black or Black or African American, 1.0% Native American, 0.6% Asian, 0.1% Native Hawaiian and Pacific Islander, 0.6% other races, and 1.5% from two or more races. 2.4% of the population were Hispanic or Latino of any race.

=== 2000 census ===
As of the 2000 census, there were 24,334 people, 9,161 households, and 6,806 families in the county. The population density was 44 people per square mile (17 people/km^{2}). There were 10,179 housing units at an average density of 18 units per square mile (6.9/km^{2}). The racial makeup of the county was 97.89% White, 0.18% Black or African American, 0.30% Native American, 0.35% Asian, 0.02% Pacific Islander, 0.35% from other races, and 0.92% from two or more races. 1.46% of the population were Hispanic or Latino of any race. 39.4% were of German, 9.6% American, 8.8% Irish and 7.9% English ancestry.

There were 9,161 households, out of which 35.80% had children under the age of 18 living with them, 63.30% were married couples living together, 7.60% had a female householder with no husband present, and 25.70% were non-families. 21.60% of all households were made up of individuals, and 9.40% had someone living alone who was 65 years of age or older. The average household size was 2.63 and the average family size was 3.07.

The county population contained 27.90% under the age of 18, 7.00% from 18 to 24, 29.00% from 25 to 44, 23.80% from 45 to 64, and 12.30% who were 65 years of age or older. The median age was 37 years. For every 100 females there were 97.70 males. For every 100 females age 18 and over, there were 95.00 males.

The median income for a household in the county was $46,515, and the median income for a family was $52,196. Males had a median income of $36,639 versus $24,612 for females. The per capita income for the county was $20,156. About 4.20% of families and 5.20% of the population were below the poverty line, including 7.10% of those under age 18 and 4.50% of those age 65 or over.

== Communities ==
=== Cities ===
- Louisville
- Plattsmouth (county seat)
- Weeping Water

=== Villages ===
- Alvo
- Avoca
- Cedar Creek
- Eagle
- Elmwood
- Greenwood
- Manley
- Murdock
- Murray
- Nehawka
- South Bend
- Union

=== Census-designated places ===
- Beaver Lake
- Buccaneer Bay
- Lake Waconda

=== Unincorporated communities ===
- Cullom
- Factoryville
- Mynard
- Rock Bluff
- Wabash

=== Census divisions ===
Cass County is divided into the following divisions, called precincts, except for the cities of Plattsmouth and Weeping Water.

- Avoca
- Center
- East Rock Bluff
- Eight Mile Grove
- Elmwood
- Greenwood
- Liberty
- City of Louisville
- Mount Pleasant
- Nehawka
- City of Plattsmouth
- Plattsmouth
- Salt Creek
- South Bend
- Stove Creek
- Tipton
- Weeping Water (City)
- Weeping Water
- West Rock Bluff

== Politics ==
At the presidential level, Cass County voters have voted predominantly for the Republican candidate. In only one national election since 1936 has the county given a majority to the Democratic Party candidate, that being 1964, which Lyndon B. Johnson won in a landslide nationally.

United States presidential election results for Cass County, Nebraska
Year	Republican		Democratic		Third party(ies)	
Year	No.	%	No.	%	No.	%
1900	2,922	55.02%	2,259	42.53%	130	2.45%
1904	2,711	58.76%	1,466	31.77%	437	9.47%
1908	2,440	49.09%	2,387	48.03%	143	2.88%
1912	970	22.41%	2,009	46.41%	1,350	31.19%
1916	1,927	40.79%	2,595	54.93%	202	4.28%
1920	3,575	58.35%	2,192	35.78%	360	5.88%
1924	3,639	49.55%	2,352	32.03%	1,353	18.42%
1928	4,970	63.91%	2,739	35.22%	68	0.87%
1932	2,756	34.14%	5,155	63.86%	161	1.99%
1936	3,669	42.44%	4,922	56.93%	54	0.62%
1940	4,704	56.46%	3,627	43.54%	0	0.00%
1944	4,588	59.34%	3,144	40.66%	0	0.00%
1948	3,527	53.70%	3,041	46.30%	0	0.00%
1952	5,088	66.16%	2,602	33.84%	0	0.00%
1956	4,814	63.87%	2,723	36.13%	0	0.00%
1960	4,506	61.68%	2,799	38.32%	0	0.00%
1964	2,947	42.57%	3,975	57.43%	0	0.00%
1968	3,185	57.61%	1,739	31.45%	605	10.94%
1972	4,503	71.39%	1,805	28.61%	0	0.00%
1976	3,807	53.31%	3,205	44.88%	129	1.81%
1980	5,193	66.42%	2,007	25.67%	618	7.90%
1984	5,461	68.04%	2,499	31.14%	66	0.82%
1988	4,664	55.61%	3,677	43.84%	46	0.55%
1992	4,314	43.23%	2,949	29.55%	2,716	27.22%
1996	4,878	50.37%	3,477	35.90%	1,330	13.73%
2000	6,144	59.77%	3,656	35.56%	480	4.67%
2004	7,763	67.33%	3,619	31.39%	147	1.28%
2008	7,120	58.74%	4,753	39.21%	249	2.05%
2012	7,556	62.04%	4,367	35.85%	257	2.11%
2016	8,452	65.35%	3,484	26.94%	997	7.71%
2020	10,121	66.04%	4,737	30.91%	468	3.05%
2024	10,685	67.50%	4,824	30.47%	321	2.03%

== See also ==
- Naomi Institute
- National Register of Historic Places listings in Cass County, Nebraska
- Eugene T. Mahoney State Park
