= Nebraska Legislature 2nd district =

American legislative district

Nebraska's 2nd legislative district
- Map of Nebraska Legislature districts with the 2nd district shaded in red
Senator
| Robert Clements; R–Elmwood |
since 2017
- Demographics: 91% White; 1% Black; 3.7% Hispanic; 1.4% Asian; 0.3% Native American
- Population (2020): 40,708

The Nebraska Legislature's 2nd district is one of the 49 legislative districts in the Nebraska Legislature. The district is located in southeastern Nebraska and covers Cass County and part of Lancaster County cutting into Lincoln. Notable settlements in the area include Plattsmouth, Louisville, Eagle, Weeping Water, and Elmwood. Robert Clements has represented the district since 2017.

== Demographics ==
The US Census Bureau recorded the population as of 2020 at 40,708.

- 91% of the district is White.
- 3.6% of the district is Hispanic.
- 1.4% of the district is Asian.
- 1% of the district is Black.
- 0.3% of the district is Native American.

== List of senators ==
| Senator | Party | Years of service | Legislature | Hometown |
|---|---|---|---|---|
| Robert Clements | Republican | 2017 - present | 105th-109th | Elmwood |
| Bill Kintner | Republican | 2013-2017 * | 103rd-105th | Papillion |
| Paul Lambert | Republican | 2011-2013 | 102nd | Plattsmouth |
| Dave Pankonin | Republican | 2007-2011** | 100th-101st | Louisville |
| Roger Wehrbein | Republican | 1987-2007 | 90th-99th | Plattsmouth |
| Calvin Carsten | Republican | 1971-1987 | 82nd-89th | Avoca |

- Bill Kintner resigned before his term ended. Robert Clements was appointed by Governor Pete Ricketts.
- Dave Pankonin resigned before his term ended. Paul Lambert was appointed to replace him.
