= Gil Peterson (American football) =

American football coach, athletics administrator (1930–2016)

Biographical details
- Born: February 25, 1930; Plattsmouth, Nebraska, U.S.
- Died: June 17, 2016 (aged 86); Dade City, Florida, U.S.

Playing career
- 1949: Napa
- 1950: Omaha
- Position: Tackle

Coaching career (HC unless noted)
- 1954–1959: Huron (line)
- 1960–1969: Huron

Administrative career (AD unless noted)
- ?–1970: Huron
- 1970–1994: Western Illinois

Head coaching record
- Overall: 47–40–3

Accomplishments and honors

Championships
- 2 SDIC (1960, 1964)

Gil Peterson (February 25, 1930 – June 17, 2016) was an American football and coach and athletics administrator. He served as the head football coach at Huron College—later known as Huron University—in Huron, South Dakota from 1960 to 1969. Peterson was the athletic director at Western Illinois University in Macomb, Illinois from 1970 to 1994.

Peterson was born on February 25, 1930, in Plattsmouth, Nebraska. He attended Plattsmouth High School and the University of Omaha—now known as the University of Nebraska Omaha. Peterson died on June 17, 2016, in Dade City, Florida.

Peterson played football as a tackle at Napa Junior College—now known as Napa Valley College–in 1949 and at Omaha in 1950. He signed a contract with the San Francisco 49ers of the National Football League (NFL) in 1952. Peterson served as line coach at Huron College from 1954 until he was promoted to head football coach in 1960. Peterson was also the athletic director at Huron before leaving for Western Illinois in 1970.

== Head coaching record ==
Year	Team	Overall	Conference	Standing	Bowl/playoffs
Huron Scalpers (South Dakota Intercollegiate Conference) (1960–1969)
1960	Huron	7–2	5–1	T–1st	
1961	Huron	7–2	5–1	2nd	
1962	Huron	5–4	5–1	2nd	
1963	Huron	6–3	5–1	2nd	
1964	Huron	7–2	6–0	1st	
1965	Huron	5–4	3–3	T–4th	
1966	Huron	1–7–1	1–4–1	T–6th	
1967	Huron	5–3–1	4–1–1	2nd	
1968	Huron	2–6–1	2–4	5th	
1969	Huron	2–7	1–5	T–6th	
Huron:		47–40–3	37–21–2		
Total:		47–40–3			
National championship Conference title Conference division title or championship game berth
