= Joe Krejci =

American football player (1906–1992)

- Krejci in the 1980s.

No. 25, 30
- Position: End

Personal information
- Born: March 16, 1906; Plattsmouth, Nebraska, U.S.
- Died: August 10, 1992 (aged 86); Lee County, Florida, U.S.
- Listed height: 6 ft 0 in (1.83 m)
- Listed weight: 190 lb (86 kg)

Career information
- High school: Plattsmouth (NE)
- College: Peru State

Career history
- Chicago Cardinals (1934); St. Louis/Kansas City Blues (1934)

Awards and highlights
- Peru State Athletics Hall of Fame (1987)

Career statistics
- Games played: 1
- Stats at Pro Football Reference

Joseph Albert Krejci (March 16, 1906 – August 10, 1992) was an American football end who played one game in the National Football League (NFL) for the Chicago Cardinals and one year in the American Football League (AFL) for the St. Louis/Kansas City Blues. He played college football for Peru State.

Krejci was born on March 16, 1906, in Plattsmouth, Nebraska. He attended Plattsmouth High School in his hometown, being called by his coach the school's "greatest all-around athlete". After graduating, he joined Peru State College, playing quarterback in football and center in basketball. He also was a member of their track team. He was an all-state selection in basketball in all four of his years at the school, and also earned those honors in football.

In 1932, he played baseball for the Omaha Packers of the minor Western League.

After finishing his college career, Kejci spent several years as a teacher and coach in local high schools. To stay in shape, he played minor league baseball during the summer.

In 1934, after being out of football for five years, Krejci signed a contract with the Chicago Cardinals of the National Football League (NFL). Playing the end position, he appeared in one professional game before finishing the year with the St. Louis/Kansas City Blues in the American Football League (AFL).

After his brief stint in professional football, Krejci returned to teaching and coaching at the high school level. After retiring, he moved to North Fort Myers, Florida, where he lived until his death in 1992. He was inducted into the Peru State Athletics Hall of Fame in 1987.
