= Wehrbein =

Wehrbein is a surname. Notable people with this surname include:

- Roger Wehrbein (born 1938), American politician from Nebraska
- Thiska Thiel-Wehrbein (1866–1941), Dutch women's rights activist
