= Omaha and Southern Interurban Railway =

US rail company

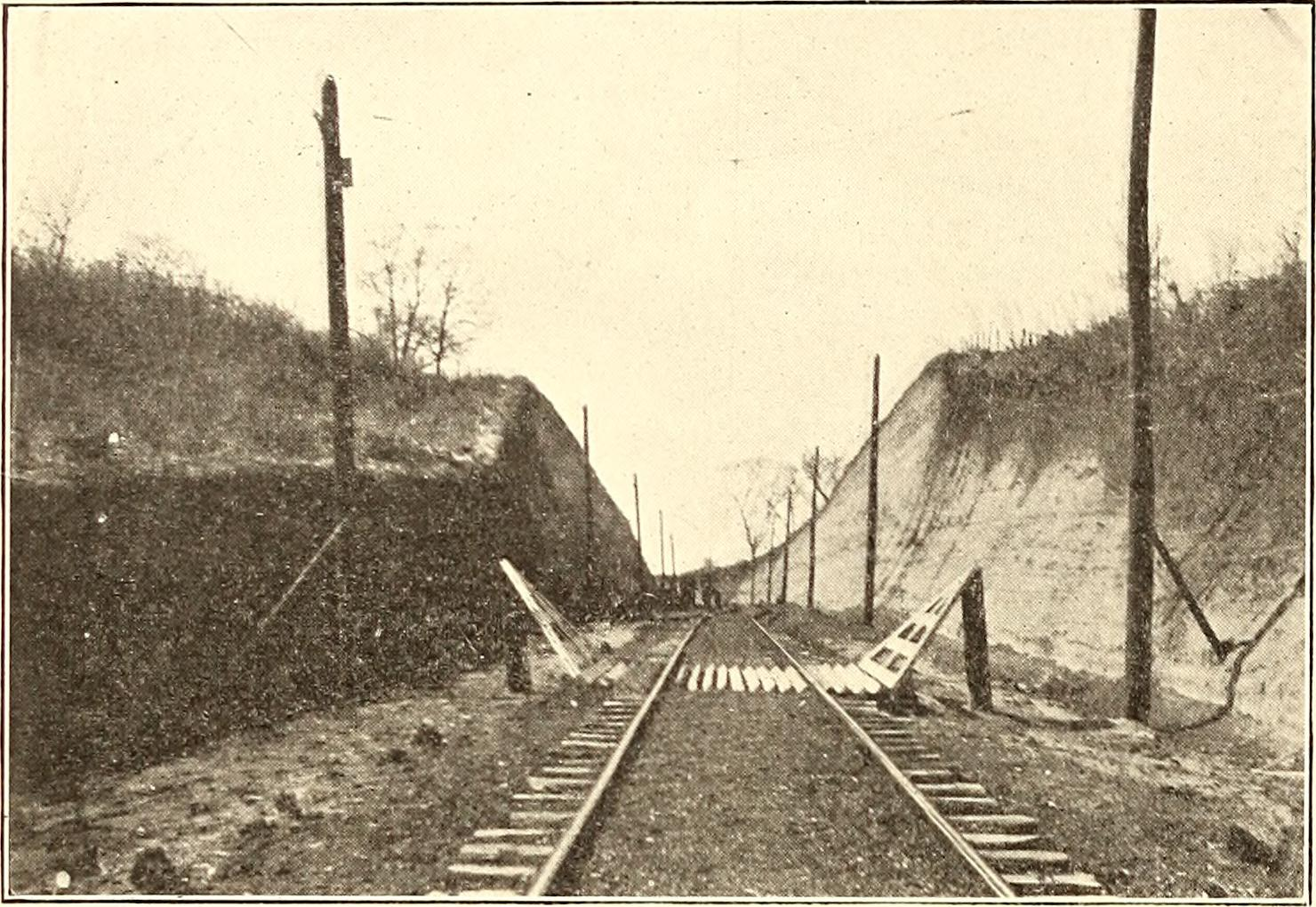
A 48 feet (15 m) deep cut on the Omaha & Southern Interurban Railway showing the steep banks

The Omaha & Southern Interurban Railway Company built and operated around 1907 an interurban railway from South Omaha, Nebraska, to Belleview College and Fort Crook, six miles (9.7 km) south.

== Route ==
The chosen route required a large amount of grading. For the entire length of the line cuts averaged about 40,000 cu. yds. per mile (19,000 m^{3} per km), and for several miles the road was a succession of cuts and fills. The deepest cut was midway of the line and was 48 feet (15 m) deep. Owing to the peculiar holding qualities of the clay in which the cuts were made, the slope of the banks was made ¼ to 1, which is quite in contrast to the practice of 1½ to 1 elsewhere. R. N. Towl, of Omaha was in charge of the construction.

The line was planned to be extended to Plattsmouth, about 10 miles (16 km) south of Fort Crook, the initial southern terminus. This fort was a government post, and usually four or five companies were stationed at it. The line was built on private right of way 100 feet (30 m) wide. Fills for single track were 22 feet (6.7 m) wide at the top and cuts were 37 feet (11 m) wide at the bottom. Oak ties and 70-lb. per yard (35 kg/m) rails were used.

== Electric infrastructure ==
Span trolley construction was employed. The poles, which were of cedar, were spaced 100 feet (30 m) apart, and those on one side of the track were high enough to carry high-tension cross-arms. The butts were treated with a tar compound, the bi-product obtained in the manufacture of artificial gas. A lightning arrester was installed every quarter mile.

Initially, power was obtained direct from the direct-current power house of the Omaha & Council Bluffs Street Railway Company. As the terminus of the line is 12 miles (19 km) from the power house, a booster was employed, which raised the voltage at the power house to 825 Volts. The booster set consisted of two 100-kW Edison bi-polar generators. The winding of the one serving as a motor was unchanged. The voltage of the other has been halved and the amperage doubled by connecting the armature leads so as to give two independent circuits paralleled by the brushes. Plans contemplated a sub-station in South Omaha for the city lines and power for the interurban line to be obtained from this.

== Operation ==
An hourly service was ordinarily maintained by one car, but during the summer season three were scheduled to be operated. The cars used were 30 feet (9.1 m) long, seated forty-four people, and were equipped with four G. E. 67 motors. They were maintained in the shops of the Omaha & Council Bluffs Street Railway.

== See also ==
- Omaha Southern Railway
