= Plattsmouth Main Street Historic District =

Historic district in Nebraska, United States

- U.S. National Register of Historic Places
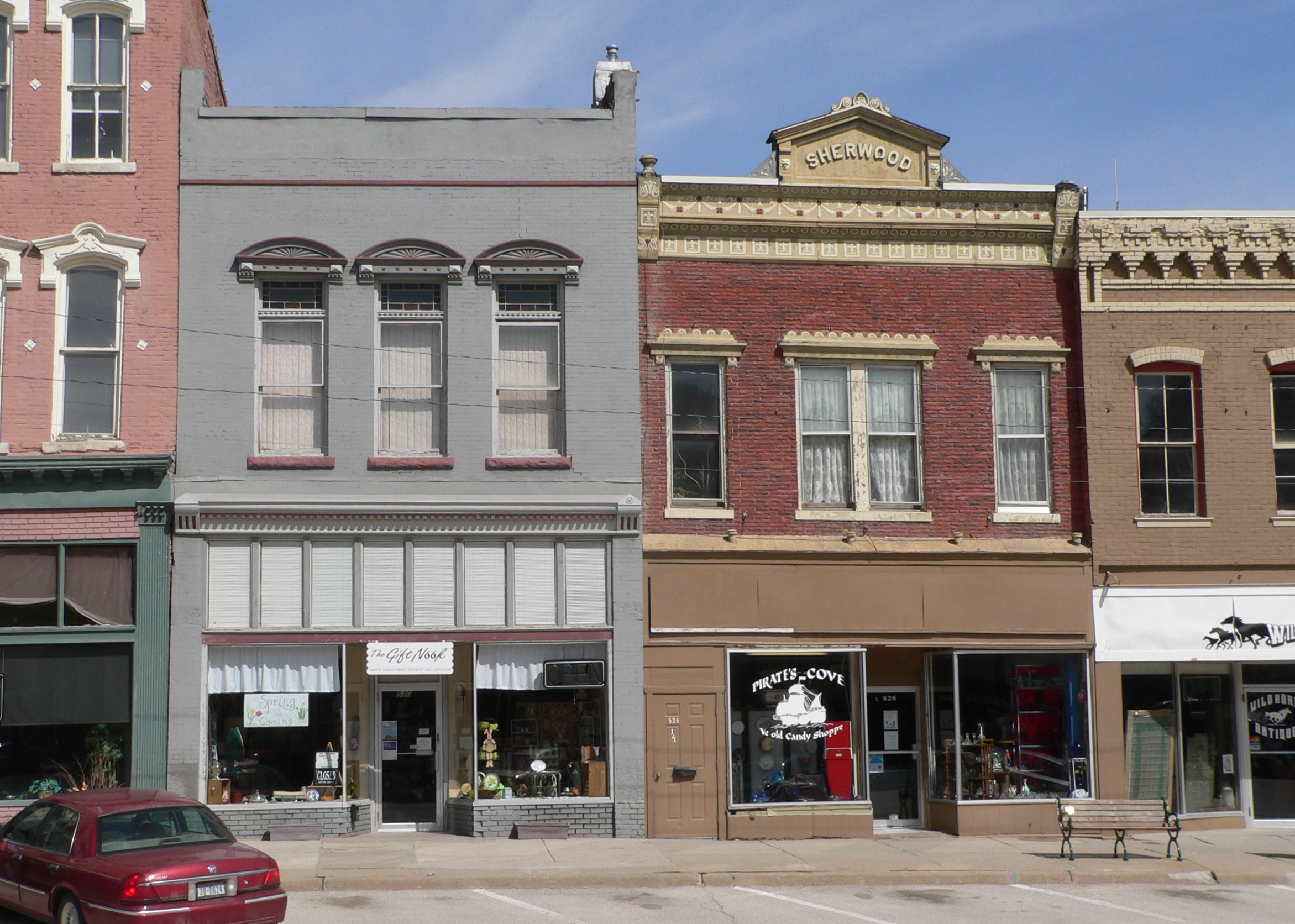

- Location within Nebraska Location within the United States
- Location: Main St. bounded by Avenue A, S. and N. 3rd St., 1st Ave. and S. and N. 7th St., Plattsmouth, Nebraska
- Coordinates: 41°00′41″N 95°53′04″W
- Area: 11 acres (4.5 ha)
- Built: 1869
- Architectural style: Classical Revival, Italianate, Romanesque
- NRHP reference No.: 85002585
- Added to NRHP: September 26, 1985

The Plattsmouth Main Street Historic District, in Plattsmouth, Nebraska, is a historic district which was listed on the National Register of Historic Places in 1985. The listing included 45 contributing buildings on 11 acres (4.5 ha).

It is in the area of Main St. bounded by Avenue A, S. and N. 3rd St., 1st Ave. and S. and N. 7th St. in Plattsmouth.

It includes:

- Cass County Courthouse (1892), 4th & Main Streets: brick, three-story 80 by 102 feet (24 m × 31 m) building with a tower at each corner and a central tower 135 feet (41 m). Designed by William Gray. Separately listed on the National Register.
- Excelsior Building (before 1885), 313 Main Street. Commercial Italianate.
