= Dean Helmick =

American politician

Member-elect of the Nebraska Legislature from the 2nd district
- Assuming office January 6, 2027
- Succeeding: Robert Clements

Personal details
- Party: Republican
- Website: Campaign website

Dean Helmick is an American politician from the Nebraska Republican Party who is the senator-elect for the 2nd district in the Nebraska Legislature. He was elected in the 2026 general election. He is from Plattsmouth, Nebraska.
