= Bill Kintner =

American politician

Member of the Nebraska Legislature from the 2nd district
- In office January 9, 2013 – January 31, 2017
- Preceded by: Paul Lambert
- Succeeded by: Robert Clements

Personal details
- Born: November 22, 1960 (age 65) Cincinnati, Ohio, U.S.
- Party: Republican

Bill Kintner (born November 22, 1960) is an American politician from the U.S. state of Nebraska. He represented a southeastern Nebraska district in the Nebraska Legislature. Kintner is a member of the Republican Party.

== Early life ==
Kintner "was born and grew up in Cincinnati, Ohio." According to Kintner, his adoptive parents raised him in a conservative, Republican, frugal, "common sense" household, along with his younger sister, who is also adopted. In an interview with the Lincoln Journal Star, Kintner said he's not interested in knowing about his birth parents; he considers his adoption to be a "blessing". He graduated from Colerain High School in 1979.

He attended Wright State University, playing college baseball until an injury ended his amateur career. He also was a writer for the college newspaper and was a member of the college's marketing club and the College Republicans. He said that his election to be president of the student government "paid for my fifth year of college." He graduated from Wright State University with a "B.S.B. in marketing and financial services".

He started as a volunteer for the presidential campaign of Ronald W. Reagan and worked for a year for the Louisiana Republican Party in Baton Rouge, before moving back to Ohio and, after he married, to Nebraska. He worked several years as a sports writer and salesperson. He is currently occupied in the marketing research field.

== Nebraska Legislature ==
Kintner was elected to the Nebraska Legislature in 2012 from the 2nd District, which consisted of all of Cass County, part of Sarpy County, and a small portion of Otoe County including part of Nebraska City. He served on the Appropriations committee.

Kintner described himself as a "Reagan conservative" and not a "Christian conservative". Kintner has said that "moral absolutes of Christianity" informs his views including on abortion. In the Lincoln Journal Star he is quoted as saying "My parents taught me the moral absolutes of Christianity, and I just applied those to everything. They didn't tell me I had to be pro-life. They gave me the belief system that I used."

=== Cybersex blackmail and fine ===
In July 2016, it was revealed that the Nebraska State Patrol was investigating allegations that Kintner had kept sexually explicit videos of himself on his state computer, possibly contravening a state law forbidding the use of state computers for non-essential personal activity. Governor Pete Ricketts stated that if the allegations were true, then Kintner should resign his seat in the legislature. Kintner rejected calls for his resignation and paid a $1,000 fine to Nebraska Accountability and Disclosure Commission in 2016 after he admitted to engaging in mutual masturbation on Skype with a woman who tried to blackmail him. Nebraska Attorney General Doug Peterson chose not to pursue criminal charges against Kintner.

Following the revelations of the cybersex tape, there were calls for his resignation from many constituents, fellow lawmakers and the governor. In December 2015, Cass County Republican Party asked Kintner to resign.

=== Women's March retweet ===
In January 2017, Kintner faced criticism for a retweet suggesting that demonstrators at a women's march weren't attractive enough to be sexually assaulted. Kintner retweeted a comment by conservative personality Larry Elder that mocked three women pictured with signs protesting Donald Trump's comments about touching women inappropriately during the 2017 Women's March. Above the photo, Elder wrote: "Ladies, I think your [sic] safe." Kintner's retweet drew immediate criticism online, from the Nebraska Democratic Party, and from Party chairwoman Jane Kleeb.

Kintner quickly released a statement saying, “By retweeting a message, I was not implying support for putting women in fear of their personal safety. I took down the retweet as soon as I became aware that it was being misconstrued." He also blamed the backlash at a "liberal activist campaign" and his political opponents, specifically Sen. Ernie Chambers of Omaha.

=== Resignation ===
Immediately following the response from the retweet controversy, Speaker of the Legislature Republican Jim Scheer planned to introduce a motion to expel Kintner and believed he had the necessary votes. Scheer met with Kintner and had "a very candid conversation". The next morning Kintner submitted his resignation letter. On January 25, 2017, Kintner announced that he would resign effective January 30, and paraphrased former US President Richard Nixon's famous "Last Press Conference" remarks. Kintner said, "This is not about justice or doing what's right. This is the old adage that might makes right. You have the votes, you can do what you want."

The Lincoln Journal-Star newspaper summarized, "Months after a cybersex scandal first threatened to end his legislative career, and after years of complaints about his behavior in office, Bill Kintner was undone by a tweet." Democratic Party chairwoman Jane Kleeb observed that "The Women's March just took down their first politician."

He was succeeded by Robert Clements, a banker from Elmwood, Nebraska, who was appointed by Gov. Pete Ricketts less than two weeks after Kintner's resignation.

== Personal life ==
Kintner is married to Lauren (née Hill) Kintner, who was an assistant attorney general under Don Stenberg, a director of policy research for former Governor Dave Heineman, and, as of 2016, served as chief policy adviser to Governor Pete Ricketts. They met in the 1990s at a Young Republican convention, when he was state chair of Ohio and she was state chair of Nebraska. They started dating in 2000, and married on October 3, 2009. He described his marriage as "a separation of powers. The legislative is downstairs and the executive is upstairs."

In a Lincoln Journal Star interview about his views, Kintner said, "Biggest mystery? Women. No one understands them. They don't even understand themselves. Books and books and books have been written about it, and no one understands it."
