= Jack Mullen =

American politician (1922–2004)

Jack Mullin

Member of the Nebraska Legislature from the 2nd district
- In office April 1, 1970 – January 5, 1971
- Preceded by: Rick Budd
- Succeeded by: Calvin Carsten

Personal details
- Born: January 16, 1922 Norfolk, Nebraska
- Died: September 20, 2004 (aged 82) Scottsdale, Arizona
- Party: Republican
- Education: University of Iowa
- Occupation: Businessman

Military service
- Allegiance: United States
- Branch/service: United States Army
- Years of service: 1942–1945

James "Jack" D. Mullen (January 16, 1922 – September 20, 2004) was a Republican politician from Nebraska who served as a member of the Nebraska Legislature from the 2nd district from 1970 to 1971.

== Early life ==
Mullen was born in Norfolk, Nebraska, in 1970, and grew up in Fonda, Iowa. He graduated from high school in 1940 and attended the University of Iowa before joining the U.S. Army during World War II. He worked for Morton House Kitchens as vice president and director, and retired in 1967. He co-founded the Jeffco Manufacturing Company in 1962 with several coworkers, which was acquired by the Ball Corporation in 1969. In 1967, Mullen was appointed by Governor Norbert Tiemann as the chairman of Nebraska's "Little Hoover Commission."

== Nebraska Legislature ==
State Senator Rick Budd declined to seek re-election in 1970, and Mullen ran to succeed him in the 2nd district, which was based in Cass and Otoe counties. On April 1, 1970, Budd resigned from the legislature, and Governor Tiemann appointed Mullen to serve out the remaining months of Budd's term.

In the nonpartisan primary, Mullen faced farmer Calvin Carsten and rancher Raymond DeRosia. Carsten placed first in the primary election, receiving 44 percent of the vote to Mullen's 43 percent and DeRosia's 13 percent. Mullen and Carsten advanced to the general election, which Carsten won in a landslide, winning 62 percent of the vote to Mullen's 38 percent.

== Death ==
Mullen died on September 20, 2004, in Scottsdale, Arizona, after relocating there with his second wife.
