= John O'Rourke (politician, born 1834) =

19th century American politician

Mayor of Plattsmouth, Nebraska
- In office April 1881 – May 5, 1882 (died)
- Preceded by: J. W. Johnson
- Succeeded by: Joseph V. Weckbach

Member of the Wisconsin State Assembly from the Juneau County district
- In office January 6, 1868 – January 4, 1869
- Preceded by: Ezra C. Sage
- Succeeded by: Jerome B. Potter

Personal details
- Born: December 1, 1834 Limerick, Ireland, UK
- Died: May 5, 1882 (aged 47) St. Louis, Missouri, U.S.
- Resting place: Oak Hill Cemetery, Plattsmouth, Nebraska
- Party: Democratic
- Spouse: Anna Marie Gilmore (m. 1875–1882)
- Children: Helen Mary "Nellie" (Parmele)^{(b. 1876; died 1956)}; John Gilmore O'Rourke^{(b. 1878; died 1914)}; Anna Louise (Bird)^{(b. 1880; died 1949)}; Joseph Thomas O'Rourke^{(b. 1882)}
- Relatives: Patrick Gilmore (brother-in-law)
- Occupation: Miller, banker

Military service
- Allegiance: United States
- Branch/service: United States Volunteers; Union Army
- Years of service: 1861–1865
- Rank: Captain, USV
- Unit: 6th Reg. Wis. Vol. Infantry
- Commands: Bty. L, 1st Reg. Ill. Lt. Artillery
- Battles/wars: American Civil War

John O'Rourke (December 1, 1834 – May 5, 1882) was an Irish American immigrant, businessman, and Democratic politician. O'Rourke is most notable for being "Johnny", the subject of the Civil War era song "When Johnny Comes Marching Home", written by his brother-in-law Patrick Gilmore. After the war, he served one term in the Wisconsin State Assembly, representing Juneau County during the 1868 term. Later he was a pioneer of Nebraska and was mayor of Plattsmouth, Nebraska, from 1881 until his death in 1882.

== Career ==
Born in Ireland, O'Rourke emigrated to the United States in 1857 and settled in Milwaukee, Wisconsin. He was a book-keeper for the John Fitzgerald firm of Milwaukee and a time conductor for the Chicago & Northwestern Railroad. He served in the 6th Wisconsin Infantry Regiment and in the 1st Illinois Light Artillery, Battery L during the American Civil War. He then moved to Juneau County, Wisconsin, and continued to work for the John Fitzgerald firm. In 1868, he served in the Wisconsin State Assembly for Juneau County and lived in the town of Kildare, Wisconsin. He also served as Juneau County treasurer. In November 1874, O'Rourke moved to Plattsmouth, Nebraska, and was the assistant cashier for the First National Bank. He was elected treasurer of the Plattsmouth Board of Trade in Plattsmouth, Nebraska. In April 1881, O'Rourke was elected mayor of Plattsmouth and served until 1882 just before his death. He was involved with the Democratic Party. O'Rourke died in St. Louis, Missouri.

== Legacy ==
O'Rourke was the subject of the American Civil War song "When Johnny Comes Marching Home." The lyrics were written by Patrick Gilmore, the brother of his future wife, Annie Maria Gilmore.
