= Battery L, 1st Illinois Light Artillery Regiment =

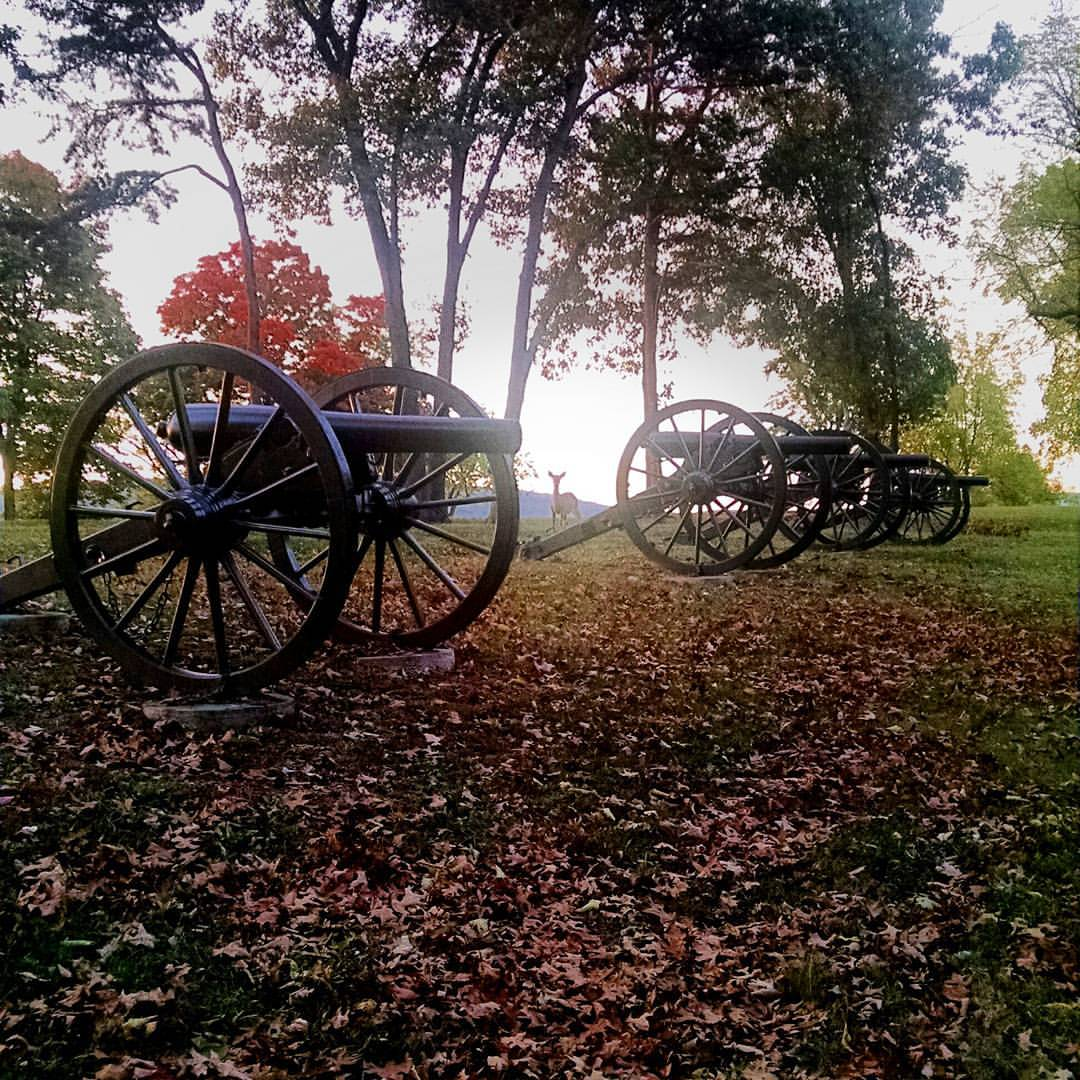
- 3-inch Ordnance rifles are shown at Harpers Ferry National Historical Park. Battery L spent most of the war guarding Harpers Ferry and the B&O railroad.
- Active: 22 Feb. 1862 – 10 July 1865
- Country: United States
- Allegiance: (United States) Union; Illinois
- Branch: Union Army
- Type: Field Artillery
- Size: Artillery Battery
- Engagements: American Civil War

Commanders
- Notable commanders: John O'Rourke

Battery L, 1st Illinois Light Artillery Regiment was an artillery battery from Illinois that served in the Union Army during the American Civil War. The battery was organized in February 1862 at Chicago and guarded prisoners until June 1862. The battery spent the remainder of the war on guard duty in West Virginia without seeing any major actions. The soldiers were mustered out in July 1865.

== History ==
=== Organization ===
Organized at Chicago, Ill., and mustered on February 22, 1862. Duty at Camp Douglas, Chicago, Ill., guarding prisoners until June, 1862, Ordered to Harper's Ferry, W. Va., June 14, thence to New Creek June 24. Attached to Railroad District, Mountain Dept., West Virginia, to July, 1862. Railroad District, 8th Army Corps, Middle Dept., to September, 1862. Railroad District, West Virginia, to January, 1863. Defenses Upper Potomac to March, 1863. 5th Brigade, 1st Division, 8th Army Corps, to June, 1863. Mulligan's Brigade, Scammon's Division, West Virginia, to December, 1863. 2nd Brigade, 2nd Division, West Virginia, to April, 1864. Reserve Division, Harper's Ferry, W. Va., to January, 1865. Unattached, 3rd Division, West Virginia, to April, 1865. Unattached, 2nd Division, West Virginia, to July, 1865.

=== Service ===
Duty at New Creek, Petersburg, Romney, Cumberland, Md., Harper's Ferry and other points in West Virginia guarding line of the Baltimore and Ohio Railroad, June, 1862, to July, 1865. Action at Ridgville Road, near Petersburg, October 29, 1862. South Fork of the Potomac River November 9, 1862. Expedition to relief of Phillippi and Grafton April 25–27, 1863. Petersburg Gap September 4, 1863. Operations in Hampshire and Hardy Counties, W. Va., December 31, 1863, to January 5, 1864. Folck's Mills August 1, 1864. Attack on Cumberland, Md., August 1. New Creek August 4. Expedition from New Creek to Moorefield November 6–8. Moorefield, near New Creek, November 27–28. (1 Section at Grafton September 27 to November 15, 1864.) Mustered out July 10, 1865.

Battery lost during service 1 Officer and 10 Enlisted men by disease. Total 11.

== See also ==
- List of Illinois Civil War units
