= Omaha Southern Railway =

The Omaha Southern Railway was a subsidiary corporation owned by the Missouri Pacific Railroad Company. In 1891, the railroad bought a plot of land south of Plattsmouth, Nebraska, that caused speculation in the town about the location of a railyard there. The railroad was also subject to a period study of subsidies it received from local and state governments.

== See also ==
- Omaha and Southern Interurban Railway
- History of Nebraska
