= Kampensnieuwland =

Coordinates: 51°35′18″N 3°40′10″E

Kampensnieuwland or Kampernieuwland is a former municipality in the Dutch province of Zeeland. It existed until 1816, when it merged into the municipality of Wissenkerke.

The municipality covered a number of polders north and northwest of the village of Kamperland. The area is now a part of the municipality of Noord-Beveland.
