= 's-Gravenhoek =

Former municipality in Zeeland, Netherlands

Coordinates: 51°35′28″N 3°46′45″E

's-Gravenhoek is a former municipality in the Dutch province of Zeeland. It consisted of a number of polders on the north side of the island of Noord-Beveland, east of Wissenkerke.

The municipality of 's-Gravenhoek was smaller than the former domain (heerlijkheid) of the same name, which included the two polders Oud-'s-Gravenhoek and Nieuw-'s-Gravenhoek, which flooded in 1745 and 1752. The remaining part of the municipality had a low population, as it contained no village or hamlet, and it merged with neighbouring Wissenkerke in 1816.
