= William Gray (architect) =

American architect

William Gray (1851-1927), an architect active in Nebraska in the United States, designed numerous buildings, several of which both survive and are listed on the National Register of Historic Places.

He was from Beardstown, Illinois before he moved to Nebraska.

Works include:

- Johnson County Courthouse (1888–89), Courthouse Sq., Tecumseh, Nebraska, NRHP-listed
- Cass County Courthouse (1891), Main St. between 3rd and 4th Sts. Plattsmouth, Nebraska, NRHP-listed
- Hamilton County Courthouse (1894), Aurora, Nebraska, NRHP-listed
