= Kildare, Wisconsin =

- Town
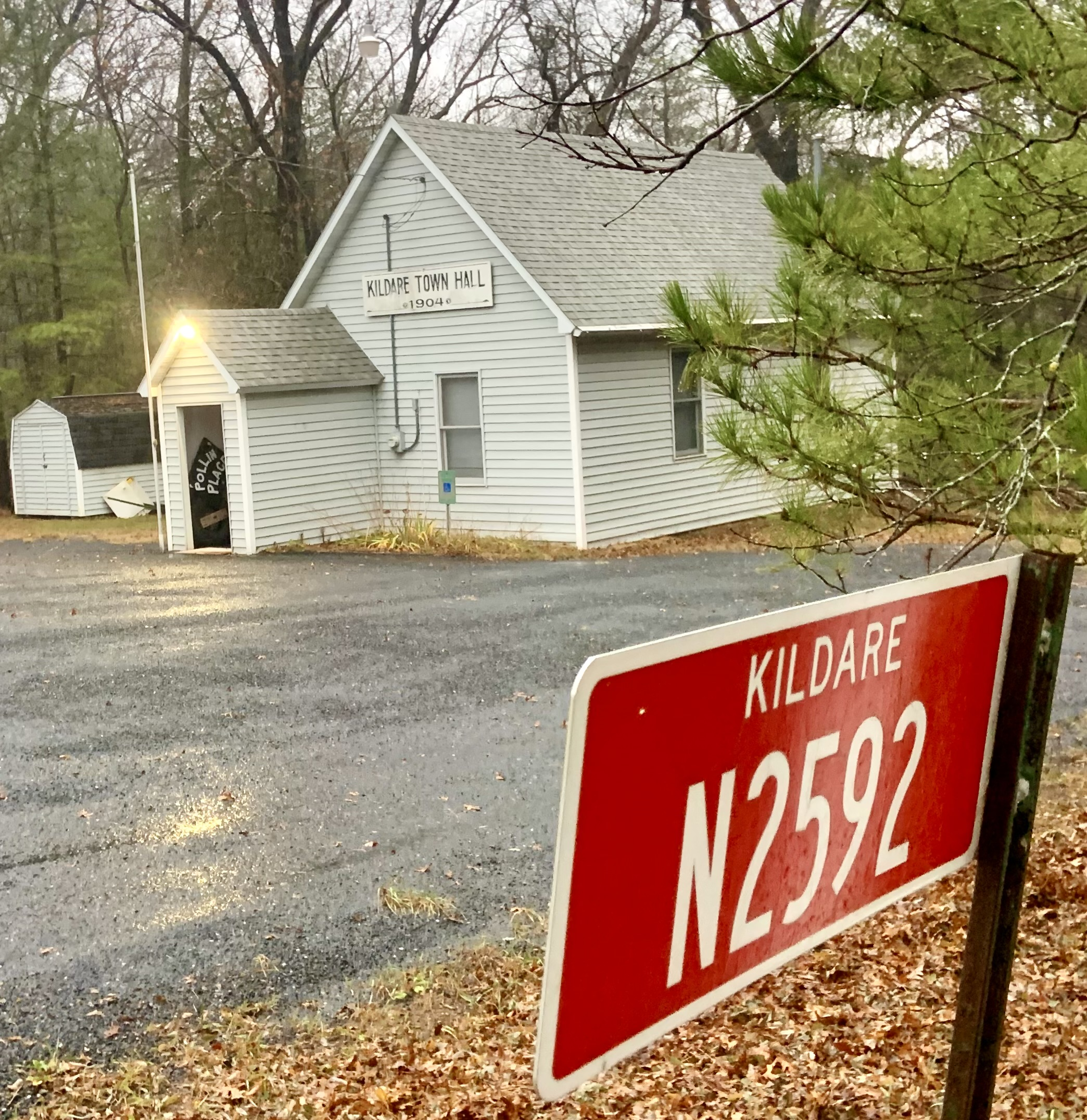
- Town hall

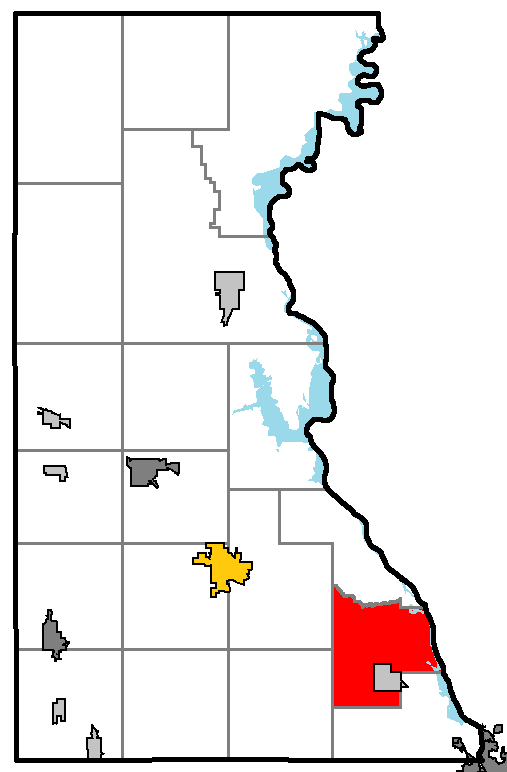
- Location of Kildare, Juneau County

- Location of Juneau County, Wisconsin
- Coordinates: 43°44′9″N 89°53′17″W
- Country: United States
- State: Wisconsin
- County: Juneau

Area
  - Total: 28.2 sq mi (73.1 km^{2})
  - Land: 27.8 sq mi (71.9 km^{2})
  - Water: 0.46 sq mi (1.2 km^{2})
- Elevation: 879 ft (268 m)

Population (2020)
  - Total: 690
  - Density: 25/sq mi (9.6/km^{2})
- Time zone: UTC-6 (Central (CST))
  - Summer (DST): UTC-5 (CDT)
- Area code: 608
- FIPS code: 55-39575
- GNIS feature ID: 1583479
- Website: https://kildaretownship.com/

Kildare is a town in Juneau County, Wisconsin, United States. The population was 690 at the 2020 census.

== History ==
It was named after the town and county of Kildare in Ireland.

== Geography ==
According to the United States Census Bureau, the town has a total area of 28.2 square miles (73.1 km^{2}), of which 27.8 square miles (71.9 km^{2}) is land and 0.5 square mile (1.2 km^{2}) (1.63%) is water.

== Demographics ==
At the 2000 census there were 557 people, 216 households, and 150 families in the town. The population density was 20.1 people per square mile (7.7/km^{2}). There were 319 housing units at an average density of 11.5 per square mile (4.4/km^{2}). The racial makeup of the town was 95.33% White, 1.08% African American, 1.44% Native American, 0.18% from other races, and 1.97% from two or more races. Hispanic or Latino of any race were 1.97%.

Of the 216 households 27.3% had children under the age of 18 living with them, 53.7% were married couples living together, 8.3% had a female householder with no husband present, and 30.1% were non-families. 24.5% of households were one person and 7.9% were one person aged 65 or older. The average household size was 2.51 and the average family size was 2.97.

The age distribution was 22.4% under the age of 18, 7.9% from 18 to 24, 27.3% from 25 to 44, 29.6% from 45 to 64, and 12.7% 65 or older. The median age was 42 years. For every 100 females, there were 113.4 males. For every 100 females age 18 and over, there were 116.0 males.

The median household income was $34,464 and the median family income was $41,250. Males had a median income of $29,286 versus $20,288 for females. The per capita income for the town was $17,052. About 0.6% of families and 3.9% of the population were below the poverty line, including none of those under age 18 and 2.4% of those age 65 or over.

== Notable people ==
- John O'Rourke, Nebraska and Wisconsin politician, lived in the town
