= Hamilton County Courthouse (Nebraska) =

- U.S. National Register of Historic Places
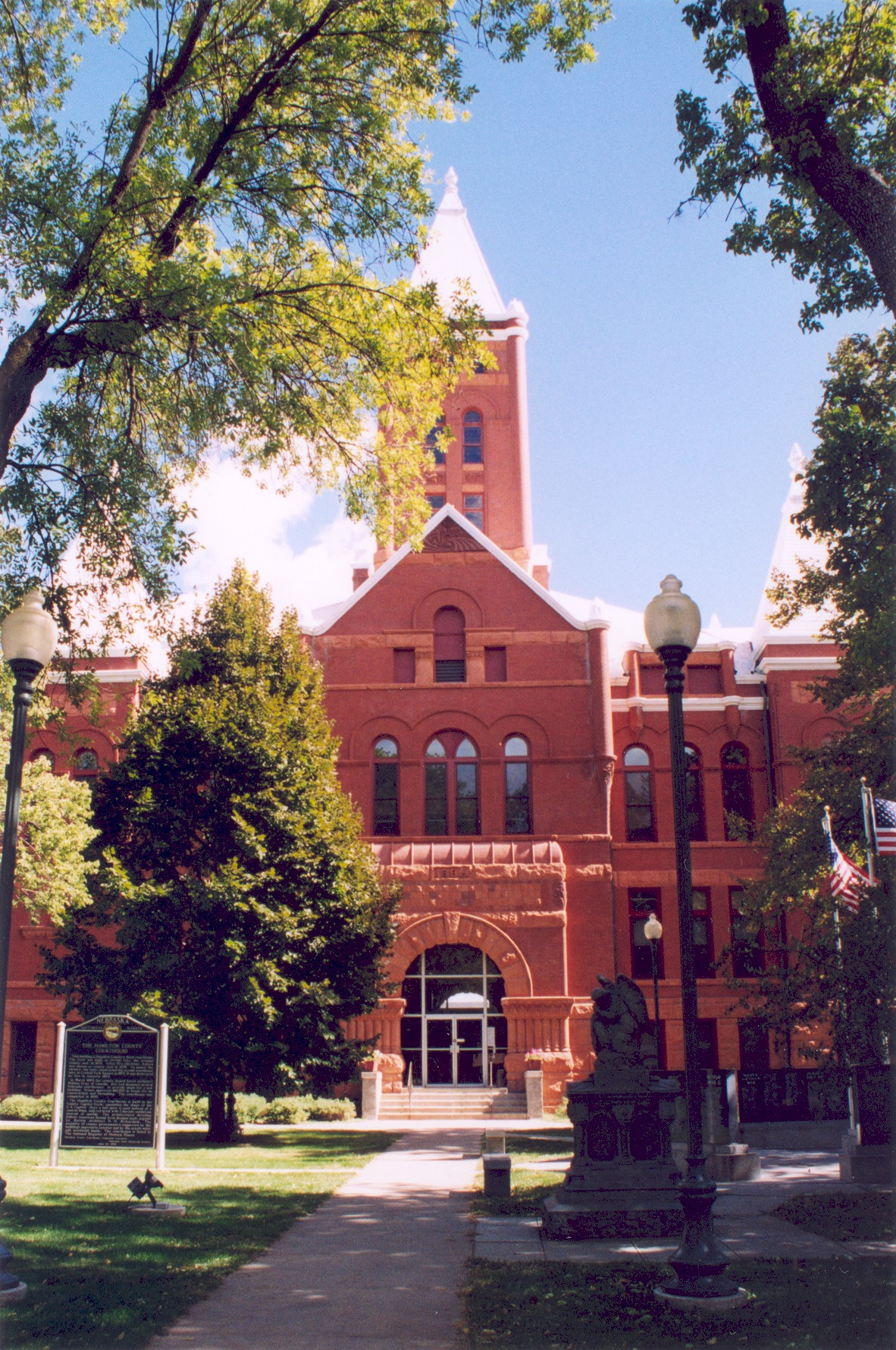
- The courthouse in 2003

- Location within Nebraska Location within the United States
- Location: Courthouse Square, Aurora, Nebraska
- Coordinates: 40°52′04″N 98°00′06″W
- Area: 4 acres (1.6 ha)
- Built: 1894
- Architect: William Gray
- Architectural style: Richardsonian Romanesque
- NRHP reference No.: 85001665
- Added to NRHP: July 29, 1985

The Hamilton County Courthouse is a historic building in Aurora, Nebraska, and the courthouse for Hamilton County, Nebraska. It replaced the 1877 courthouse, which in turn replaced the 1870 courthouse. This third courthouse was built in 1894, and designed in the Richardsonian Romanesque style by architect William Gray. It has been listed on the National Register of Historic Places since July 29, 1985.
