= Paul Lambert (Nebraska politician) =

American politician

- Paul Lambert in 2026

Member of the Nebraska Legislature from the 2nd district
- In office 2011–2013
- Preceded by: Dave Pankonin
- Succeeded by: Bill Kintner

Personal details
- Born: July 12, 1950 (age 76) Omaha, Nebraska, U.S.
- Party: Republican

R. Paul Lambert (born July 12, 1950) is an American politician who was a member of the unicameral Nebraska Legislature. He was born in Omaha, Nebraska and resides in Plattsmouth, Nebraska.

== Early life ==
Lambert graduated from Nehawka High School and attended Wayne State College and the University of Omaha. Prior to his appointment to the legislature, he was first a member of the city council and then mayor of Plattsmouth, Nebraska.

== State legislature ==
Lambert was appointed in 2011 to represent the 2nd Nebraska legislative district to replace Dave Pankonin, who resigned. He sat on the General Affairs, Health and Human Services, Nebraska Retirement Systems, and Urban Affairs committees. Although he won the primary, he lost to Bill Kintner in the 2012 general election.

== See also ==
- Nebraska Legislature

Preceded by Dave Pankonin	Nebraska Legislature District 2; 2011–2013	Succeeded by Bill Kintner
