= Cass County Courthouse (Nebraska) =

- U.S. National Register of Historic Places
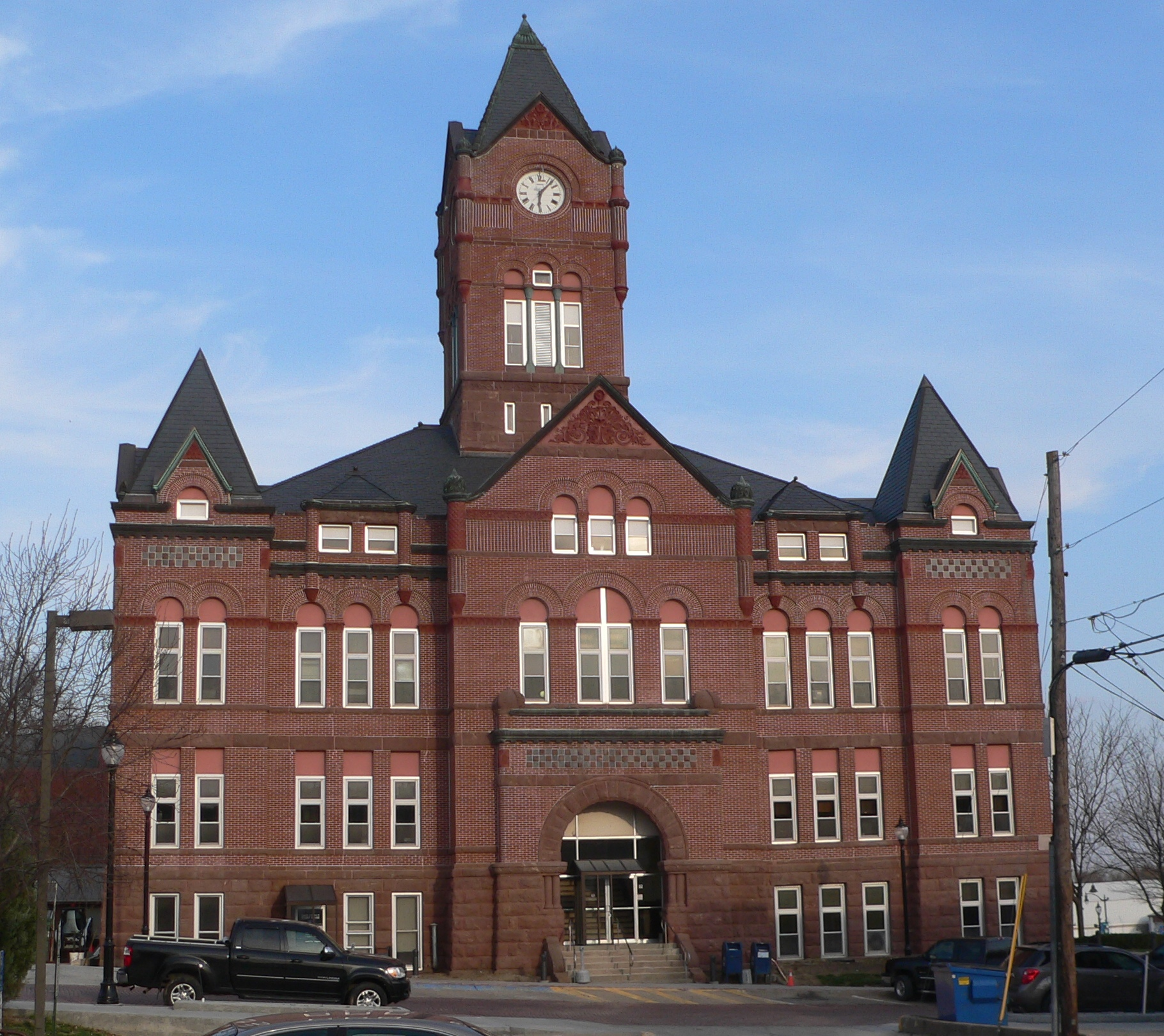

- Location within Nebraska Location within the United States
- Location: Main St. between 3rd and 4th Sts., Plattsmouth, Nebraska
- Coordinates: 41°00′42″N 95°53′01″W
- Area: less than one acre
- Built: 1891
- Architect: William Gray
- Architectural style: Romanesque
- Part of: Plattsmouth Main Street Historic District
- MPS: County Courthouses of Nebraska MPS
- NRHP reference No.: 89002248
- Added to NRHP: January 10, 1990

The Cass County Courthouse in Plattsmouth, Nebraska was built in 1891. It was listed on the National Register of Historic Places in 1990.

It was designed by architect William Gray. Built of brick, terra cotta, and stone, it is a two-story building, 80 by 102 feet (24 m × 31 m) in plan. It has a tall (135 feet (41 m)) central clock tower, and four corner towers, each with steep hipped roofs and elaborate ornamentation.
