= Roger Wehrbein =

American politician

Member of the Nebraska Legislature from the 2nd district
- In office 1987–2007
- Preceded by: Calvin Carsten
- Succeeded by: Dave Pankonin

Personal details
- Born: August 18, 1938 (age 88) Lincoln, Nebraska, U.S.
- Party: Republican
- Education: University of Nebraska–Lincoln

Roger Wehrbein (born August 18, 1938) is an American politician and a former member of the unicameral Nebraska Legislature.

== Early life ==
Born in Lincoln, Nebraska, Wehrbein graduated from Plattsmouth High School and the Agriculture College of the University of Nebraska–Lincoln. He was in the U.S. Army from 1961 to 1962, and was a U.S. Army Reserve company commander. Wehrbein married Jeanene Markussen on October 7, 1961; they have two, Douglas and David.

== Political career ==
Wehrbein began his political career on the Cass County Fair Board and as Cass County Commissioner. He was elected to the legislature, representing Nebraska's Legislative 2nd district centered in Plattsmouth, Nebraska, on November 4, 1986, and was re-elected four times from 1990 to 2002. He was on the Appropriations Committee for 18 years, and chaired the committee for 10 years.

== Personal life ==
Wehrbein continued to work on his family's farm, alongside his three brothers, while serving as representative and after his term ended. He also has worked on the Plattsmouth Bridge Commission, and participated in the movement to build a new university fraternity house for Alpha Gamma Rho.

Wehrbein's wife, Jeanene, died on November 6, 2016.

== Honors and awards ==
- Nebraskan of the Year, Rotary Clubs of Nebraska, 2008
- Alumni Service Award, College of Agricultural Sciences and Natural Resources, 2003/2004
- Nebraska Hall of Agriculture Achievement
- Omaha Agribusiness Club Gamma Sigma Delta honoree, 1999
- Nebraska Agribusiness Club honoree, 1980
- Alpha Gamma Rho outstanding alumnus, 1976, 1981
- Omaha Area Kiwanis Farm Family of the Year, 1984
- UNL Block and Bridle Club honoree, 1993.
- Alternate delegate, 1996 Republican National Convention

Preceded by Calvin Carsten	Nebraska Legislature District 2; 1987–2007	Succeeded by Dave Pankonin
