= Rick Budd =

American politician (1920–1988)

Member of the Nebraska Legislature from the 2nd district
- In office January 5, 1965 – April 1, 1970
- Preceded by: William Brandt
- Succeeded by: Jack Mullen

Personal details
- Born: April 12, 1920 Independence, Missouri
- Died: June 25, 1988 (aged 68) Omaha, Nebraska
- Party: Republican
- Spouse: Clara Lee Keller (m. 1945)
- Children: 4 (Rick, Linda, Ralph, Virginia)
- Education: Central Methodist College; University of Southern California; University of Missouri (B.S.)
- Occupation: Automobile dealer

Rick S. Budd (April 12, 1920 – June 25, 1988) was a Republican politician from Nebraska who served as a member of the Nebraska Legislature from the 2nd district from 1965 to 1970.

== Early life ==
Budd was born in Independence, Missouri, in 1920, and attended Central Methodist College and the University of Southern California before graduating with his bachelor's degree in business administration from the University of Missouri. Budd owned and operated several companies in Nebraska City, including a car dealership, hardware store, and appliance store. He served as a member of the Nebraska City School Board.

== Nebraska Legislature ==
In 1964, Budd ran for the state legislature from the 2nd district. Following redistricting, the 2nd district, which included Nemaha and Otoe counties, was redrawn to include Cass and Otoe counties. Incumbent State Senator William Brandt declined to seek re-election, and faced former State Senator Frank Sorrell and farmer Carl Swanson in the primary election. Budd placed first in the primary election, receiving 48 percent of the vote to Sorrell's 28 percent and Swanson's 23 percent, and he advanced to the general election with Sorrell. Sorrell died on August 20, 1964, and was replaced on the ballot by Swanson. Budd defeated Swanson by a wide margin, receiving 59 percent of the vote to Swanson's 41 percent.

Budd ran for a second term in 1966. He was challenged by farmer Calvin Carsten and ironworker William Heier. Budd placed first in the primary election, receiving 61 percent of the vote to Carsten's 33 percent and Heier's 6 percent. Budd and Carsten advanced to the general election, where Budd defeated Carsten, winning re-election with 59 percent of the vote.

== Post-legislative career ==
On April 1, 1970, Budd resigned from the state legislature to serve as the Nebraska state director of the Small Business Administration. He stepped down as state director in 1988.

== Death ==
Budd died on June 25, 1988.
