= Thiska Thiel-Wehrbein =

Dutch women's rights activist

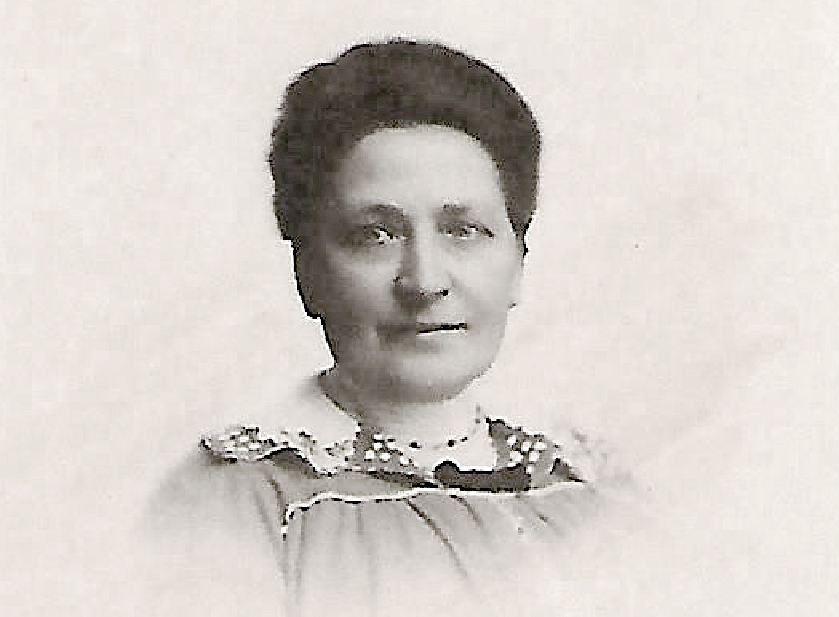
Thiska Thiel-Wehrbein

Thiska Thiel-Wehrbein (* 31 August 1866 in Amsterdam; † 26 September 1941 in Haarlem) was a Dutch women's rights activist and pacifist. From 1917, she was an active spokesperson for women's rights, children's rights, Dutch disarmament and the left-liberal ‘Vrijzinnig Democratische Bond’ until she had to limit her activities in 1924 due to asthma.

== Milestones in her life ==
=== Before the First World War ===
Thiska Wehrbein was born in Amsterdam in 1866 as the daughter of the inland shipping captain Arnold Wehrbein, a descendant of Westphalian immigrants, and his wife Ebelina Wehrbein-Bruins.

In 1889, she married the 26-year-old Jan Hendrik Thiel III in Haarlem, who came from a family of teachers in Wissenkerke and, like his father, stated ‘school headmaster’ on the marriage certificate, but later worked in Haarlem as a lawyer and director of a company.

In 1905, Thiel-Wehrbein founded the ‘Vrouwen-Ontwikkelingsclub’ (Women's Advancement Club) in Haarlem, which set itself the goal of ‘organising women to work together to improve their economic and political situation, to fight in the struggle of the working class against capitalism, to stand up for their rights where they are disregarded or oppressed as women.’ She headed this club until at least 1908.

=== During the First World War ===
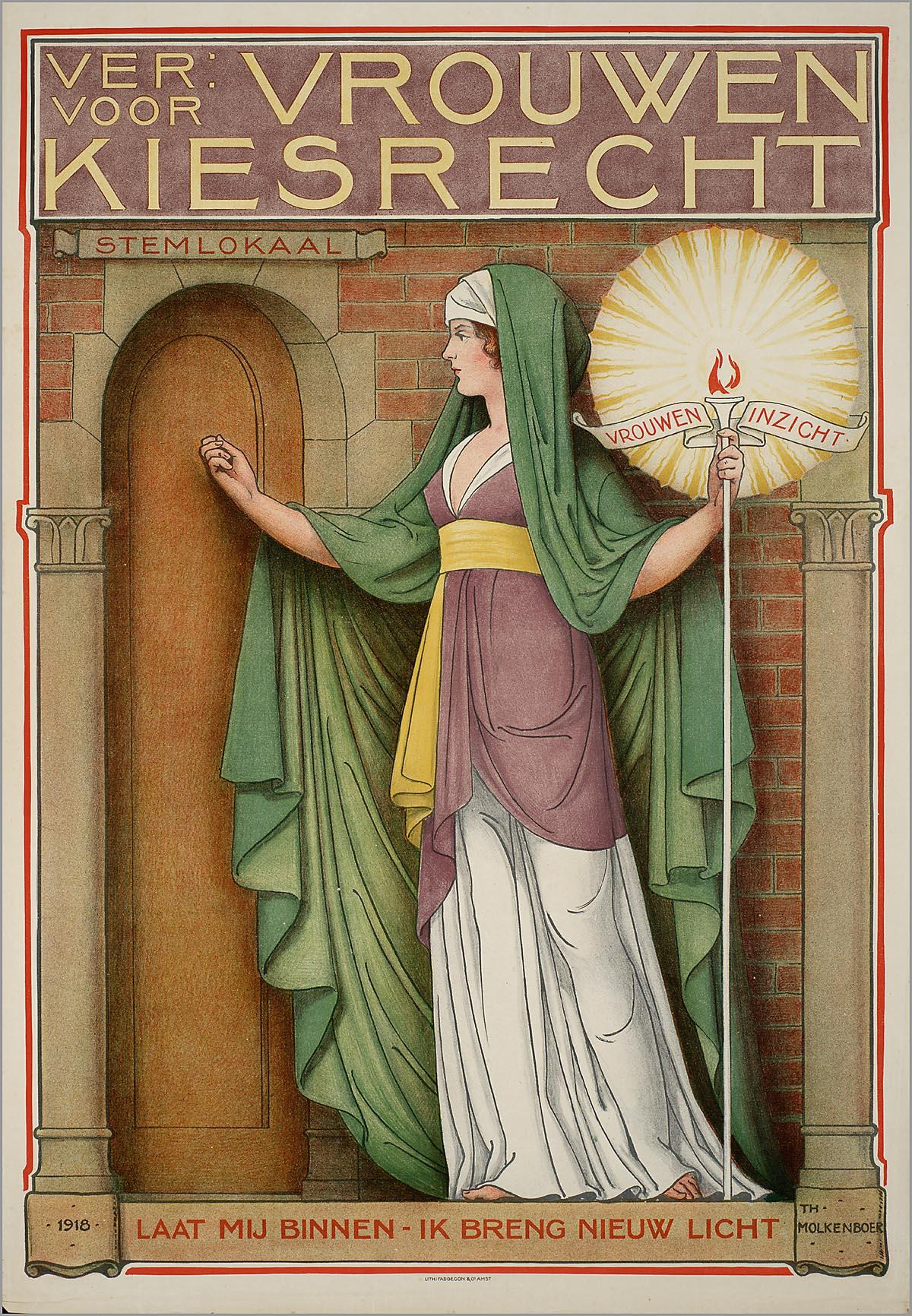
Poster of the Dutch Association for Women's Suffrage

In March 1917, a first lecture by Thiel-Wehrbein is reported: to the Amsterdam Housewives' Association on “Het huisgezin en zijn geschiedenis” (The domestic family and its history). Other lecture topics until 1922 were: ‘Het huisgezin door alle eeuwen’ (The housewife through all centuries), ‘Samenwerking van de Huisvrouwen op elk gebied’ (The co-operation of housewives in all areas) and ‘De Vrouw en de Stembus’ (The woman and the ballot box).

In September 1917, Thiel-Wehrbein founded the Free Democratic Women's Club (Vrijzinnig Democratisch Vrouwenclub) in Amsterdam and became its chairwoman.

In March 1918, Thiska Thiel-Wehrbein became a member of the new Women's Committee for Food Distribution of the Dutch National Food, Agricultural and Industrial Products Administration Office (‘Rijks-Centraal Administratiekantoor voor het Regelen van den Uitvoer, den Invoer en de Distributie van Levensmiddelen, land- en nijverheidsproducten’). Although the Netherlands were neutral during the First World War, they had to keep their armed forces in a state of constant mobilisation to safeguard this neutrality, which meant that there was a shortage of skilled labour in agriculture and industry. Food was rationed as early as autumn 1914. In 1917, the government set up rationing offices to better manage the rationing system. The conservative-denominational government also tried to increasingly involve representatives of the left-wing party spectrum, such as Thiska Thiel-Wehrbein, in the unpopular rationing system and spread the responsibility over more shoulders.

In the summer of 1918, Thiska Thiel-Wehrbein was the first woman to be appointed to the advisory commission for the Dutch Imperial Milk and Cheese Board (‘Rijkskantoor voor Melk en Kaas’).

=== After the First World War ===
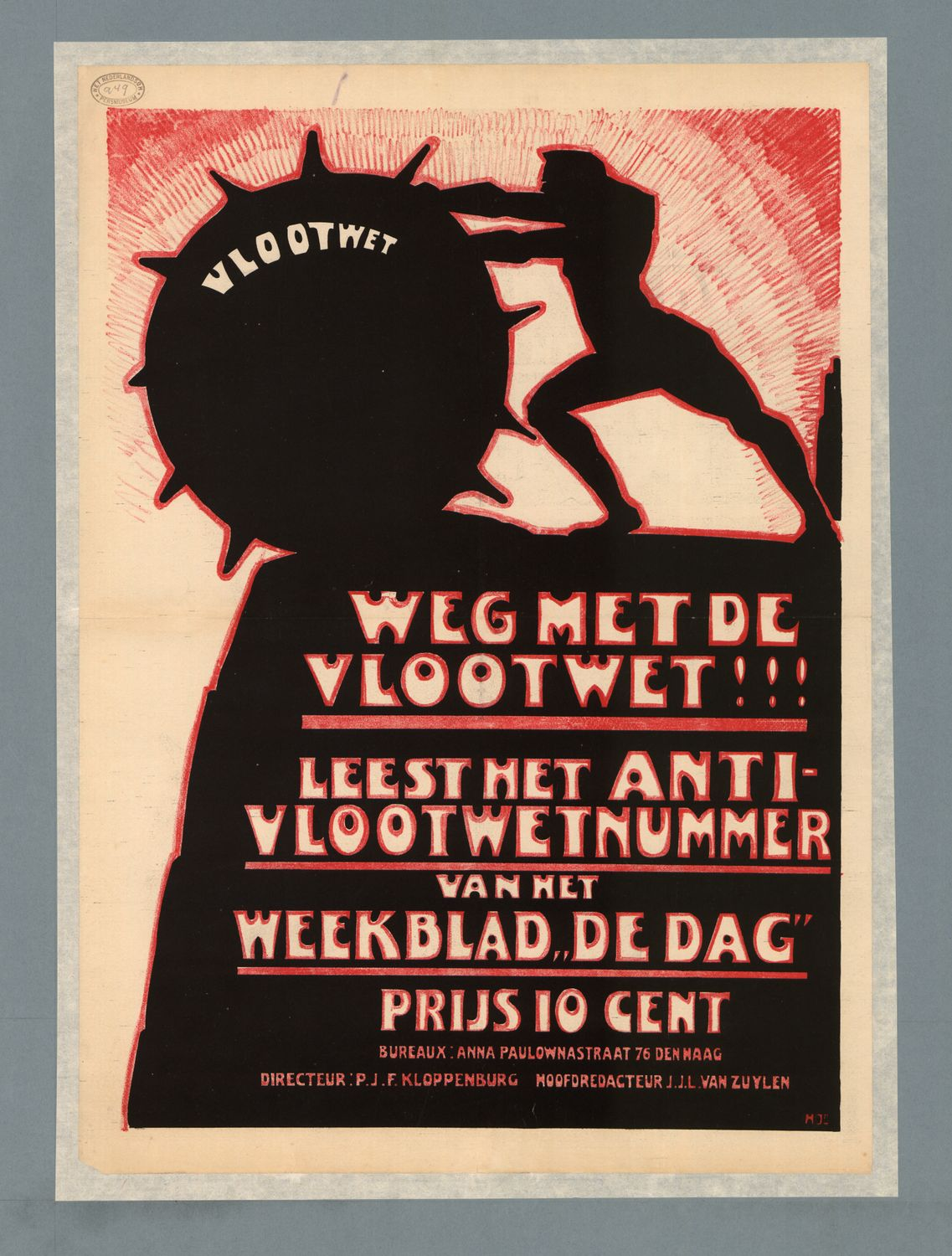
Propagandistic poster against the ‘Vlootwet’ (the Fleet Expansion Act)

Although women's suffrage was introduced in the Netherlands with effect from 28 September 1919, nationwide parliamentary elections would not take place until 1922. Dutch women thus voted or were elected first in the municipal elections of 1919. Among them was Thiska Thiel-Wehrbein. In these elections, she was the first woman to be elected to the city council of Amsterdam for the left-liberal ‘Vrijzinnige Democraten’. In Amsterdam, Mrs Thiel was the first female member of the committee for the supervision of teacher training in Haarlem, president of the Association for Women's Suffrage and the Liberal Democratic Women's Club. She was also a member of the editorial board of the monthly bulletin of the Association for Women's Suffrage.

In 1921, she - herself the wife of a lawyer - campaigned for the creation of specialised judges for juvenile delinquents, the ‘kinderrechters’ (juvenile judges).

In 1922, she and the Genootschap voor Zedelijke Volkspolitiek (Society for the Moral Politics of the People), which she led, campaigned for the complete disarmament of the Netherlands. Eighteen years before the occupation of the Netherlands by the Third Reich, this society postulated in the Baptist Zondagsbode (Sunday Messenger): ‘The dangers that threaten the Netherlands (...) in the foreseeable future can be regarded as relatively small, both those of a direct enemy attack for annexationist purposes and those of a violation of neutrality in the event of an equal war between other powers.’ Specifically, this was intended to prevent the planned law to expand the Dutch navy (‘Vlootwet’).

In 1922, she became president of the ‘Vereeniging van Staatsburgeressen’, the most important suffragette organisation in the Netherlands.

In the only surviving publication by Thiska Thiel-Wehrbein, ‘The Woman and Politics’, she said:

'The women of today, who have their hearts in the right place, must feel that they can no longer afford the luxury of remaining inactive. They must realise that they too have duties to society, that they should at least try to make this society a safer and happier place in which to live. (...) And while women will now have the right to vote to directly influence the making of laws, those who are serious about improvement but get goose bumps when they hear the word ‘politics’ (and there are a few!) should try to get over their fears and find out what the word means first."

In 1923, she served on the board of the Free Democratic Women's Club, which, in its own words, was concerned with ‘propaganda among women’.

In 1924 she resigned from her post as president of the Association of Women Citizens, which had shortly before successfully campaigned for the introduction of women's suffrage, due to ‘bronchitis’, but probably because of severe asthma. The editors of the Vrijzinnig-democraat commented: ‘Mrs Thiel-Wehrbein has won a place in the hearts of the members through her quiet kindness, her great unpretentiousness and unsurpassed willingness’.

== Family ==
Thiska Thiel-Wehrbein had four children, including Johannes Hendrik Thiel, a well-known classical philologist and scholar of antiquity, and Ebelina van Eck-Thiel, one of the first female lawyers in the Netherlands.
