= Calvin Carsten =

American politician (1915–1992)

Member of the Nebraska Legislature for the 2nd district
- In office January 5, 1971 – January 7, 1987
- Preceded by: Jack Mullen
- Succeeded by: Roger Wehrbein

Personal details
- Born: November 11, 1915 Avoca, Nebraska
- Died: December 25, 1992 (aged 77) Lincoln, Nebraska
- Party: Republican
- Spouse: Ruth Thelma Ruge (m. 1937)
- Children: 3 (Sally, Carroll, Steven)
- Parent: Fred Carsten (father)
- Education: University of Nebraska–Lincoln
- Occupation: Farmer

Calvin Carsten (November 11, 1915 – December 25, 1992) was a Republican politician from Nebraska who served as a member of the Nebraska Legislature for the 2nd district from 1971 to 1987.

== Early career ==
Carsten was born in Avoca, Nebraska, in 1915, the son of State Senator Fred Carsten. Carsten graduated from Avoca High School and the University of Nebraska, and worked on his family farm.

== Nebraska Legislature ==
In 1966, Carsten challenged State Senator Rick Budd for re-election in the 2nd district. In the primary election, Budd placed first, winning 61 percent of the vote to Carsten's 33 percent and ironworker William Heier's 6 percent. In the general election, Budd defeated Carsten by a wide margin, winning 59–41 percent.

Budd declined to seek re-election in 1970, and Carsten ran for the seat again. He was joined in the primary by investment company owner Jack Mullen and ranch owner Raymond DeRosia. One month before the primary, Budd resigned from office following his appointment as state director of the Small Business Administration. Governor Norbert Tiemann appointed Mullen to serve out the remainder of Budd's term. In the primary election, Carsten narrowly placed first, winning 44 percent of the vote to Mullen's 43 percent and DeRosia's 13 percent. Carsten defeated Mullen in a landslide in the general election, receiving 62 percent of the vote to Mullen's 38 percent.

In 1974, Carsten ran for re-election to a second term, and he was challenged by laborer Michael Fitzpatrick. In the primary election, Carsten placed first over Fitzpatrick, 77–23 percent. Carsten won his second term in a landslide in the general election, defeating Fitzpatrick with 71 percent of the vote. In 1978, Carsten ran for re-election to a third term, and was re-elected unopposed.

Carsten sought a fourth term in 1982, and faced a crowded field of challengers, including Richard Halvorsen, a state penitentiary employee, and Boyd Linder and Vernon Waterman, who were former members of the Plattsmouth School Board. In the primary election, Carsten placed first, winning 44 percent of the vote, and advanced to the general election against Linder, who placed second with 35 percent. Carsten ultimately won re-election by a narrower margin than his past races, defeating Linder with just 54 percent of the vote.

In 1986, Carsten declined to seek re-election to a fifth term.

== Death ==
Carsten died on December 25, 1992.
