= Johannes Hendrik Thiel =

Johannes Hendrik Thiel (27 January 1896 in Amsterdam - 19 May 1974 in Utrecht) was a Dutch classical philologist and ancient historian.

== Life ==
Thiel's parents, the lawyer Jan Hendrik Thiel, and Thiska, née Wehrbein, moved to Haarlem in 1903, where Johannes Hendrik Thiel attended grammar school. In 1914, he began studying classical philology at the University of Amsterdam. The experience of the First World War awakened his interest in history. His academic teacher was the ancient historian Ursul Philip Boissevain. This was followed in 1920/21 by a year of study in Berlin under the Greek scholar Ulrich von Wilamowitz-Moellendorf and the historian Eduard Meyer.

On 31 May 1922, he completed his doctorate under Boissevain with a thesis on Xenophon; his expectations of being appointed Boissevain's successor were not fulfilled. In the summer of 1922, after his marriage, he became a teacher of ancient languages at his former grammar school in Haarlem. From 1927, he was assistant to the classical archaeologist and ancient historian Alexander Willem Byvanck as a private lecturer in ancient history at Leiden University, and became an associate professor in 1930. In 1938 he became a member of the Royal Netherlands Academy of Sciences.

During the German occupation, he resigned like many other Dutch professors after the bomb explosion in Leiden (1942). After his release, he was temporarily imprisoned and had to be careful afterwards. In his free time, Thiel turned to a new subject, ancient naval history. In 1946, Thiel was appointed to the Chair of Ancient History at the University of Utrecht, succeeding Hendrik Bolkestein. The almost 50-year-old gave a programmatic inaugural speech on the independence of Classical Archaeology and Classical Studies. He became emeritus professor in 1964.

== Teaching ==
In the first phase of his academic work, Thiel focussed on ancient Greek legal sources. Later, he focussed on ancient biographies, especially the lives of Roman emperors. The third phase of his academic work was dedicated to Roman naval history. Two parts of his incomplete main work were published: Studies on the history of Roman sea-power in republican times (1946) and A history of Roman sea-power before the second Punic war (1954).

== Personality ==
Thiel was very shy and, even after 40 years of teaching, he still found it difficult to enter the lecture theatre every time. He set high standards for himself and his fellow human beings and could quickly become angry at signs of laziness, but without hatred. For him, conviction, commitment and personality were central characteristics of the historian or scientist. He therefore saw the scientist as a lone actor; he did not believe in teamwork.

Despite his personal distance from his contemporaries, he was extremely popular and respected by secondary school pupils and college students, who, according to his obituary, were almost ‘lyrical’ about his way of lecturing. In the early 1960s, fellow historians may have turned up their noses at his statement that if he had lived in Julius Caesar's time, he would have joined his murderers ‘to give him his due’ - but this won him the respect and affection of the students.
