= Dave Pankonin =

American politician

Member of the Nebraska Legislature from the 2nd district
- In office 2007–2011
- Preceded by: Roger Wehrbein
- Succeeded by: Paul Lambert

Personal details
- Born: December 1, 1951 (age 74) Lincoln, Nebraska, U.S.
- Party: Republican
- Spouse: Lori Pankonin

Dave Pankonin (born December 1, 1951) is a former member of the unicameral Nebraska Legislature.

Born in Lincoln, Nebraska, he graduated from Louisville High School in 1970. He attended the University of Nebraska–Lincoln college of Business Administration, graduating in 1974. He served as mayor of Louisville, Nebraska and on the Louisville City Council. He has two children, Paul and Stephanie, with his wife, Lori Pankonin.

He was elected to the Legislature in 2006 serving Nebraska's 2nd legislative district, in southeastern Nebraska. He served as Chairman of the Nebraska Retirement Systems Committee and was a member of the Banking, Commerce, and Insurance Committee; the Health and Human Services Committee; as well as the Committee On Committees. He resigned to devote more time to his family's agricultural equipment dealership and his added responsibilities with Home State Bank in Louisville, due to the sudden death of the bank's president. He was replaced by Paul Lambert in October 2011.
