= Robert Clements (Nebraska politician) =

American politician & businessman (born 1950)

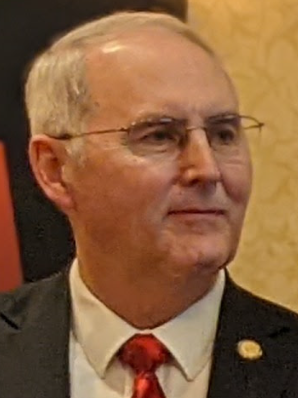

Member of the Nebraska Legislature from the 2nd district
- Incumbent
- Assumed office February 6, 2017
- Preceded by: Bill Kintner
- Succeeded by: Dean Helmick (elect)

Personal details
- Born: December 11, 1950 (age 75) Lincoln, Nebraska, U.S.
- Party: Republican
- Spouse: Peggy Sue Bogenreif (m. 1972)
- Children: 5
- Education: University of Nebraska–Lincoln

Robert Clements (born December 11, 1950) is an American politician and businessman.

== Personal life ==
Clements was born in Lincoln, Nebraska. He graduated from Elmwood High School in Elmwood, Nebraska, in 1969. Clements received his bachelor's degree in 1973 from University of Nebraska–Lincoln. Clements is a banker at American Exchange Bank in Elmwood, Nebraska.

Clements was married in 1972 to his wife, Peggy Sue. They have five children together. His aunt was a former WASP, Women Airforce Service Pilots, and former alumnus of the University of Nebraska-Lincoln.

Clements is president of the Bess Streeter Aldrich Foundation, a board member for Victory Church, and an adjutant and bugler for Sons of the American Legion. He is also the former chair of the Cass County Republican Party

== Nebraska State Legislature ==
On February 6, 2017, Clements was appointed by Governor Pete Ricketts to the Nebraska Legislature, replacing Bill Kintner, who resigned. He is involved with the Republican Party.

As of 2025, Clements serves as the chair for the Appropriations Committee, a member of the Nebraska Retirement Committee, Reference Committee, Building Maintenance, Legislative Oversight Committee, and Legislature Planning Committee. He also serves as an ex-offico member on the Executive Board.

District 2 of Nebraska's Legislative District serves the entirety of Cass County.

=== Abortion ===
Clements is pro-life and against abortion. He has listed pro-life legislation as one of his top three priorities in the Nebraska Unicameral.

=== Election Denial ===
Clements became a leading state election denier by embracing "the Big Lie" (President Trump's false claims of a stolen election) following the 2020 presidential contest by insisting Donald Trump actually won. Clements signed a public letter demanding a "forensic audit of every state election" similar to the fruitless 2021 Maricopa County presidential ballot audit. That same year, he joined a fringe right-wing group, the Nebraska Freedom Coalition, in asking for a state-backed effort to audit the 2020 Nebraska election results, specifically in Douglas and Sarpy counties, despite no evidence of fraud. Clements claimed that he was baffled how both Democrat Joe Biden and Republican Rep. Don Bacon could win in Nebraska's 2nd Congressional District, despite the fact the district experienced a similar split in 2008.

=== Immigration ===
In August 2025, Nebraska Governor Jim Pillen announced that McCook, Nebraska, would become the new site of a federal immigration facility, similar to that of Alligator Alcatraz in Florida. Clements rallied his support of the facility stating "I’m supportive of the president [Trump] enforcing the law."

=== Taxes ===
Clements voted to pass Legislative Bill (LB) 873, Change provisions relating to corporate and individual income taxes, taxation of social security benefits, and property tax credits, which was introduced by Senator Friesen. The bill passed and will go into effect over five years, reducing personal and corporate taxes.

=== Housing ===
Clements supports measures for affordable housing and rural workforce housing programs.

=== Prisons ===
Clements has stated he believes the current prison is “beyond repair, needing replaced. A new prison would have more capacity, increase programming classes, and more counseling treatment to help inmates qualify for parole sooner.”

=== Voting ===
Clements supports using an I.D. to vote and a shorter amount of time for voting by mail.

== Electoral history ==
Nebraska's 2nd Legislative District Election, 2022
Primary election
Party	Candidate	Votes	%
Republican	Robert Clements (incumbent)	5,154	53.69
Democratic	Sarah Slattery	2,221	23.14
Democratic	Janet Chung	1,674	17.44
Libertarian	Schuyler Windham	550	5.73
Total votes		9,599	100.00
General election
Republican	Robert Clements (incumbent)	9,261	56.55
Democratic	Sarah Slattery	7,117	43.45
Total votes		16,378	100.00
Republican hold			
