= Wissenkerke =

- Village
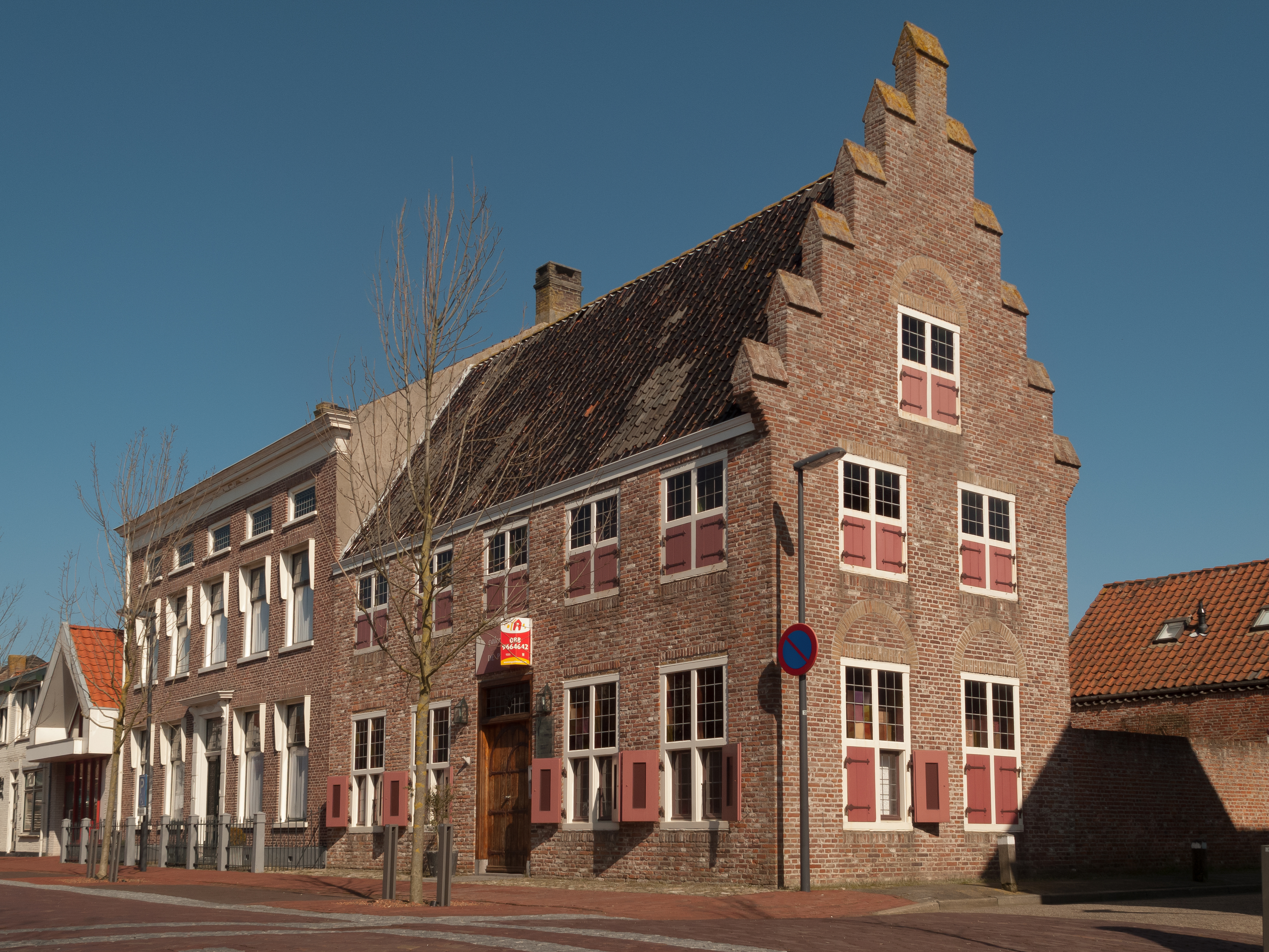
- Building in Wissenkerke

- Flag Coat of arms

- Location in the province of Zeeland in the Netherlands Wissenkerke (Netherlands)
- Coordinates: 51°35′4″N 3°44′48″E
- Country: Netherlands
- Province: Zeeland
- Municipality: Noord-Beveland

Area
  - Total: 11.79 km^{2} (4.55 sq mi)
- Elevation: 1.1 m (3.6 ft)

Population (2021)
  - Total: 1,175
  - Density: 99.66/km^{2} (258.1/sq mi)
- Time zone: UTC+1 (CET)
  - Summer (DST): UTC+2 (CEST)
- Postal code: 4491
- Dialing code: 0113

Wissenkerke is a village in the Dutch province of Zeeland. It is a part of the municipality of Noord-Beveland, and lies about 20 km northeast of Middelburg.

== History ==
The village was first mentioned in 1230 as Wiscenkerke, and means "(private) church of Wisce". The original village was lost in the Saint Felix Flood of 1530. Only the church tower remained standing for several decades as a marker of the drowned village.

A new settlement appeared after the polder was enclosed by a dike in 1652. In 1697, the Thoornpolder was diked resulting the loss of the harbour.

The Dutch Reformed church is an aisleless church which was built in 1969 to replace the church was from 1827. In 1860, the wind mill De Onderneming was built and the wind mill Landzicht followed in 1869.

In 1816, the village of Kampensnieuwland was merged into Wissenkerke. Wissenkerke was home to 1,871 people in 1840. Wissenkerke then remained a separate municipality until 1995 when it was merged into Noord-Beveland.

== Gallery ==
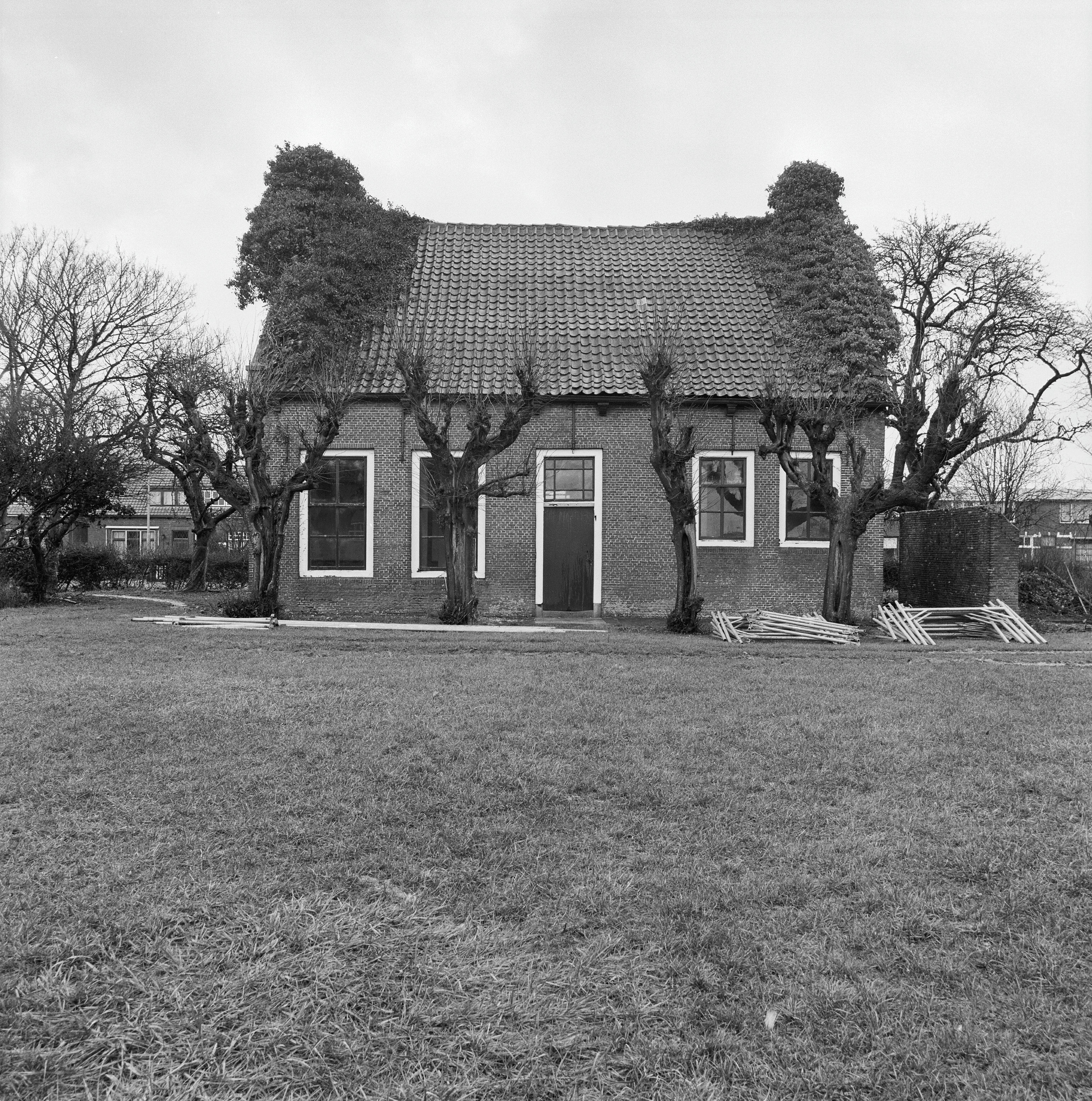
House in Wissenkerke

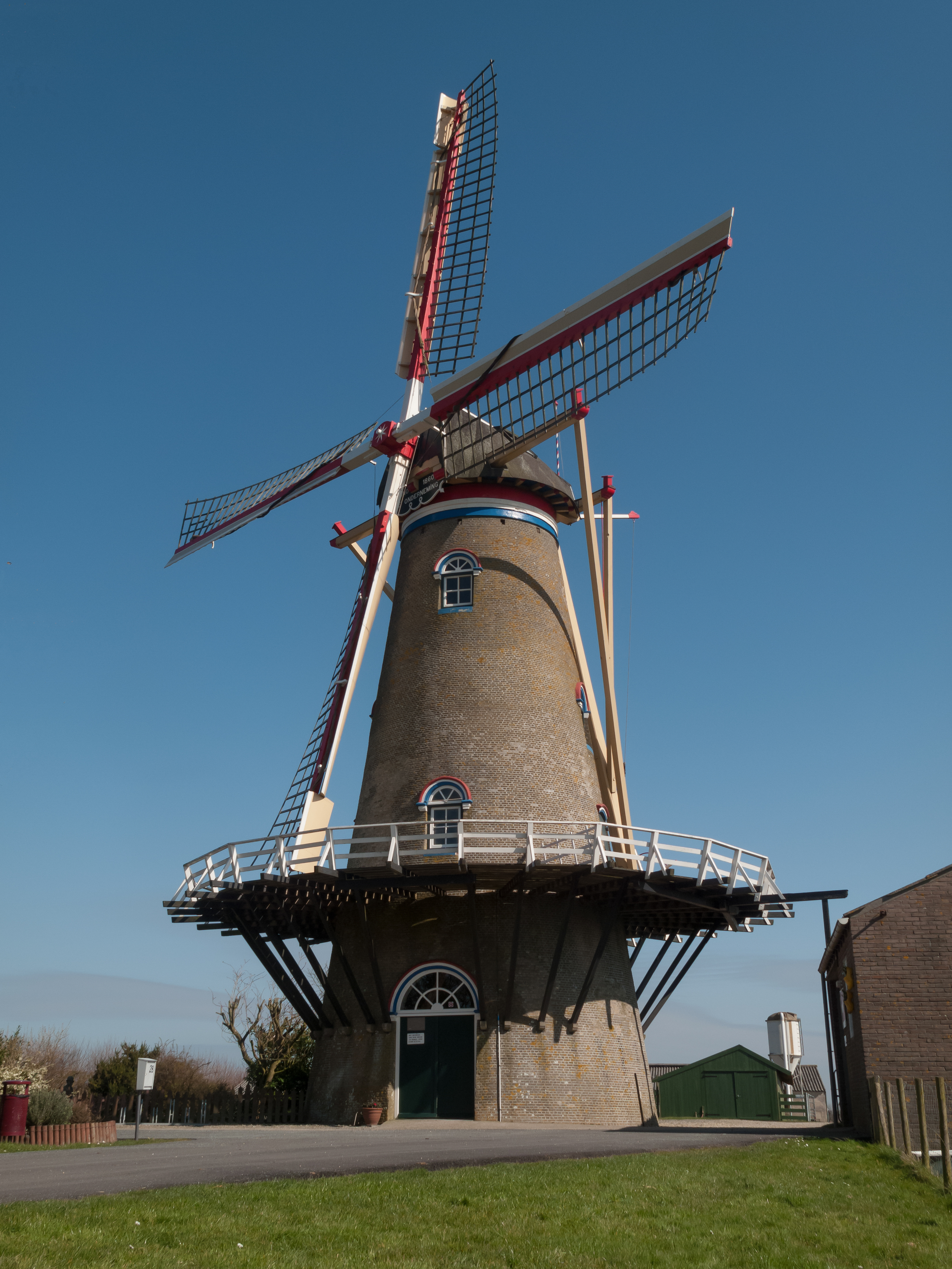
Windmill: korenmolen de Onderneming

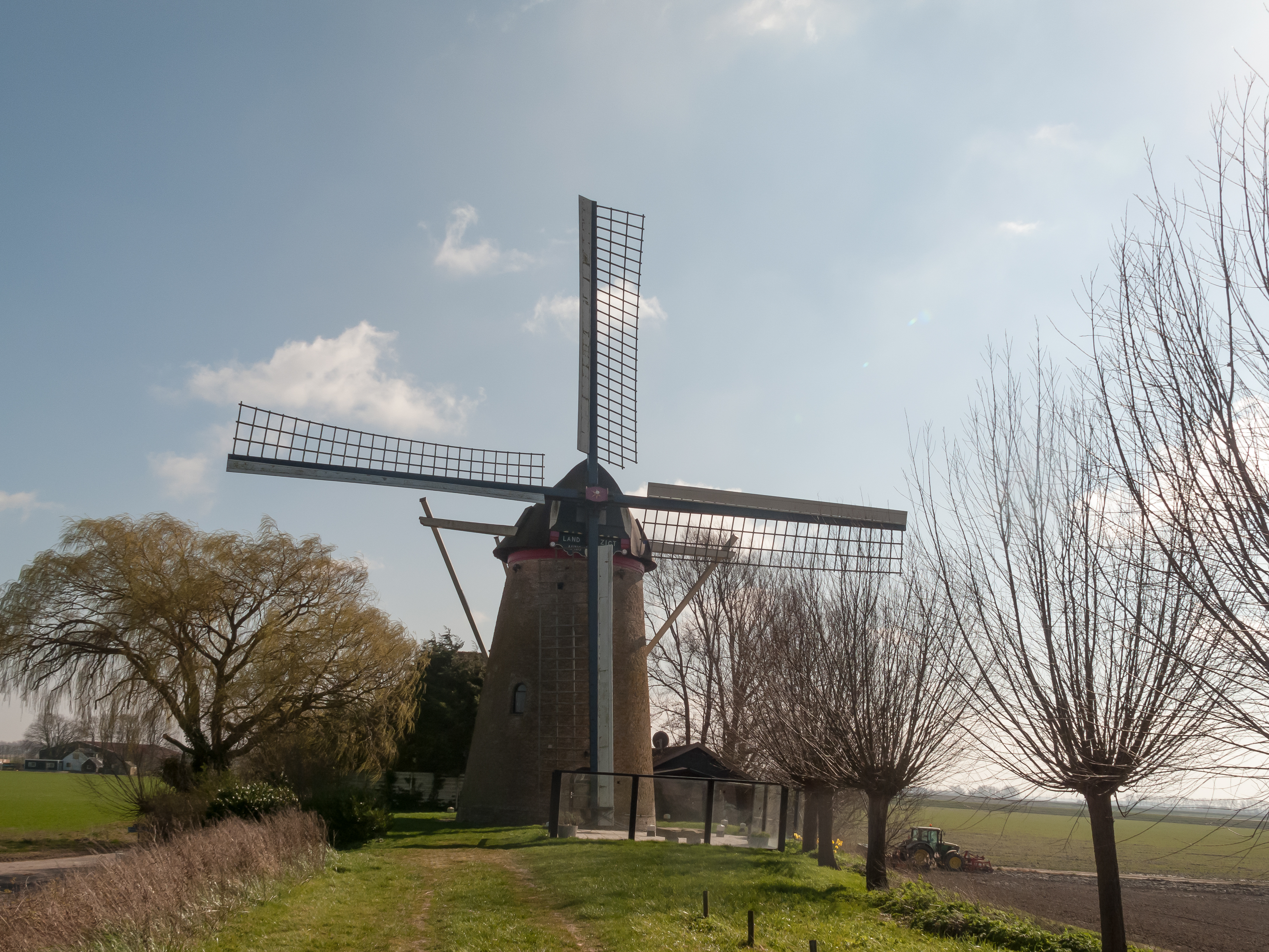
Former windmill: korenmolen het Landzigt

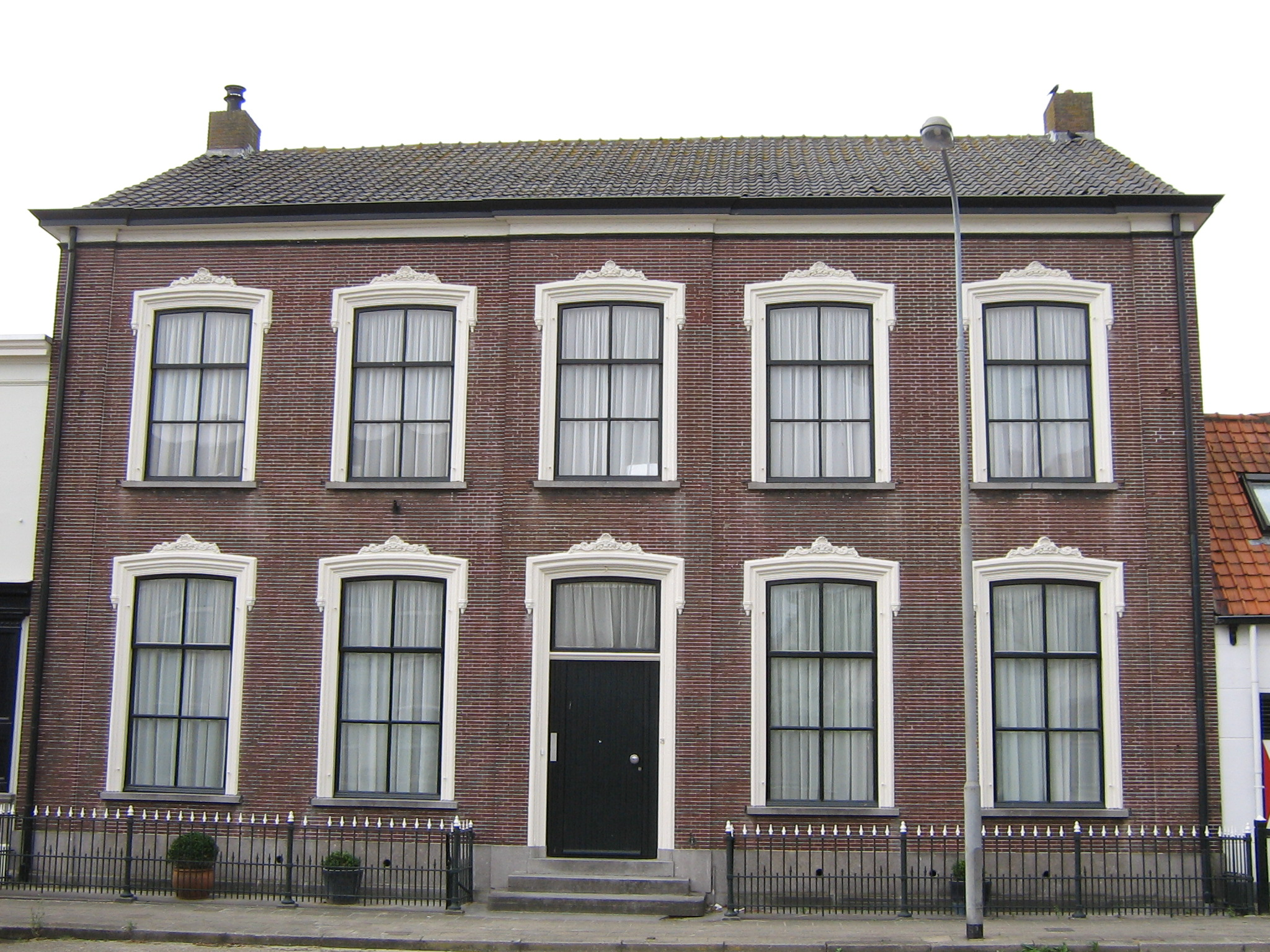
Building in Wissenkerke

== See also ==
- 's-Gravenhoek
