= Elmwood, Nebraska =

- Village
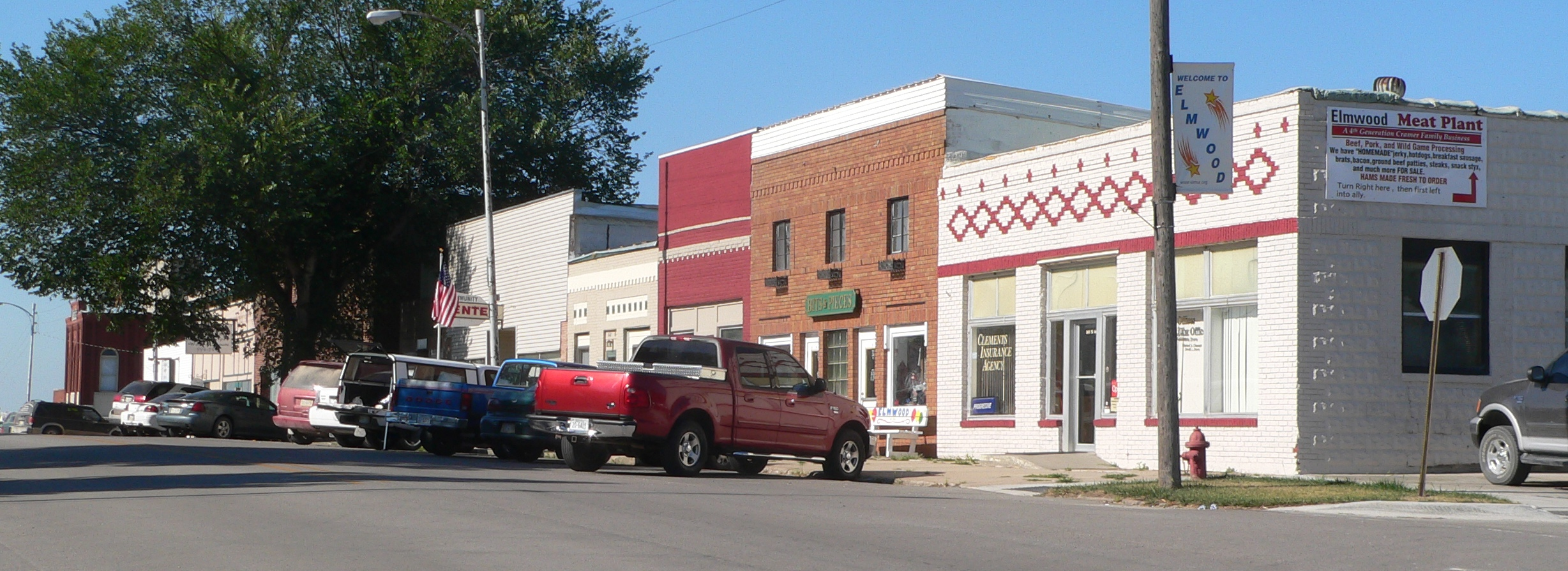
- Downtown Elmwood: 4th Street

- Location of Elmwood, Nebraska
- Coordinates: 40°50′33″N 96°17′41″W
- Country: United States
- State: Nebraska
- County: Cass

Area
  - Total: 0.37 sq mi (0.97 km^{2})
  - Land: 0.37 sq mi (0.97 km^{2})
  - Water: 0 sq mi (0.00 km^{2})
- Elevation: 1,289 ft (393 m)

Population (2020)
  - Total: 654
  - Density: 1,742.1/sq mi (672.62/km^{2})
- Time zone: UTC-6 (Central (CST))
  - Summer (DST): UTC-5 (CDT)
- ZIP code: 68349
- Area code: 402
- FIPS code: 31-15430
- GNIS feature ID: 2398816
- Website: www.elmwoodnebraska.com

Elmwood is a village in southeast Cass County, Nebraska, United States. The population was 654 at the 2020 census.

== History ==
Elmwood was founded in 1886. It was named for the old elm trees at the town site.

== Geography ==
According to the United States Census Bureau, the village has a total area of 0.38 square miles (0.98 km^{2}), all land.

== Demographics ==
Historical population
Census	Pop.	Note	%±
1880	38		—
1890	303		697.4%
1900	544		79.5%
1910	635		16.7%
1920	558		−12.1%
1930	515		−7.7%
1940	456		−11.5%
1950	445		−2.4%
1960	481		8.1%
1970	548		13.9%
1980	598		9.1%
1990	584		−2.3%
2000	668		14.4%
2010	634		−5.1%
2020	654		3.2%
U.S. Decennial Census

=== 2010 census ===
As of the census of 2010, there were 634 people, 243 households, and 168 families living in the village. The population density was 1,668.4 inhabitants per square mile (644.2/km^{2}). There were 265 housing units at an average density of 697.4 per square mile (269.3/km^{2}). The racial makeup of the village was 97.8% White, 0.2% African American, 0.5% Native American, 0.2% from other races, and 1.4% from two or more races. Hispanic or Latino of any race were 3.6% of the population.

There were 243 households, of which 39.1% had children under the age of 18 living with them, 54.3% were married couples living together, 9.5% had a female householder with no husband present, 5.3% had a male householder with no wife present, and 30.9% were non-families. 25.5% of all households were made up of individuals, and 13.2% had someone living alone who was 65 years of age or older. The average household size was 2.61 and the average family size was 3.17.

The median age in the village was 36.7 years. 30.9% of residents were under the age of 18; 5.4% were between the ages of 18 and 24; 25% were from 25 to 44; 24% were from 45 to 64; and 14.7% were 65 years of age or older. The gender makeup of the village was 49.4% male and 50.6% female.

=== 2000 census ===
As of the census of 2000, there were 668 people, 254 households, and 182 families living in the village. The population density was 1,763.7 inhabitants per square mile (681.0/km^{2}). There were 269 housing units at an average density of 710.2 per square mile (274.2/km^{2}). The racial makeup of the village was 99.10% White, 0.15% African American, 0.30% Asian, and 0.45% from two or more races. Hispanic or Latino of any race were 0.30% of the population.

There were 254 households, out of which 33.9% had children under the age of 18 living with them, 62.2% were married couples living together, 7.1% had a female householder with no husband present, and 28.3% were non-families. 25.6% of all households were made up of individuals, and 16.9% had someone living alone who was 65 years of age or older. The average household size was 2.63 and the average family size was 3.20.

In the village, the population was spread out, with 29.9% under the age of 18, 6.9% from 18 to 24, 27.1% from 25 to 44, 18.9% from 45 to 64, and 17.2% who were 65 years of age or older. The median age was 36 years. For every 100 females, there were 94.8 males. For every 100 females age 18 and over, there were 88.0 males.

As of 2000 the median income for a household in the village was $37,132, and the median income for a family was $46,875. Males had a median income of $35,250 versus $28,750 for females. The per capita income for the village was $17,662. About 3.9% of families and 6.3% of the population were below the poverty line, including 9.0% of those under age 18 and 7.3% of those age 65 or over.

== Notable people ==
- Bess Streeter Aldrich, American author and member of the Nebraska Hall of Fame, lived in Elmwood for many years. The Bess Streeter Aldrich House at 204 East F Street in Elmwood is preserved as a museum.
- Robert Clements, banker and Nebraska state legislator, lived in Elmwood.
