= Plattsmouth High School =

High school in Plattsmouth, Nebraska

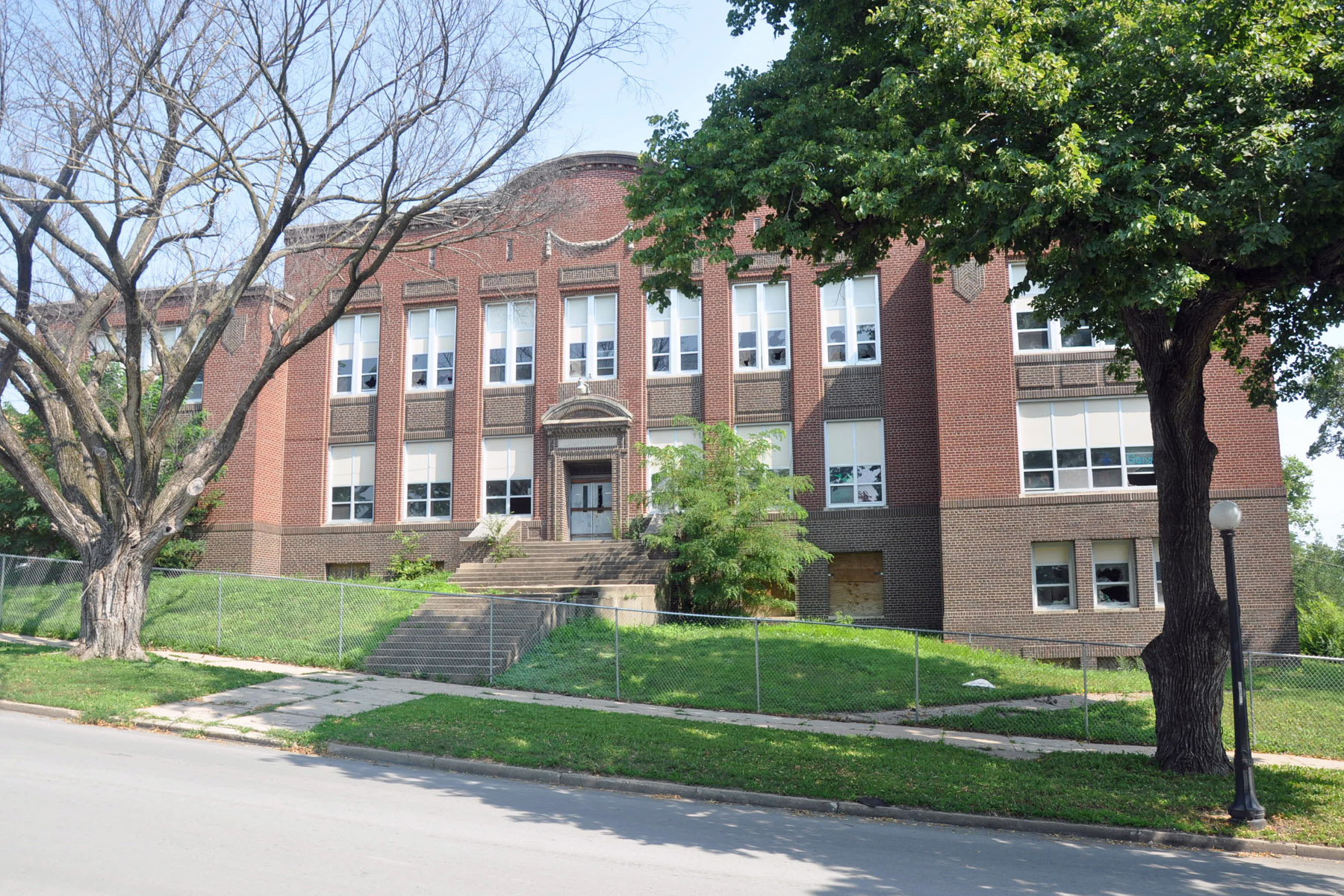

Location
- 1912 East Highway 34; Plattsmouth, Nebraska 68048; United States; 41°00′00″N 95°54′22″W

Information
- School type: High School
- Superintendent: Richard Hasty
- NCES School ID: 317566001523
- Principal: Dr. Tina Harvey
- Teaching staff: 39.10 (FTE)
- Grades: 9–12
- Enrollment: 484 (2023–2024)
- Student to teacher ratio: 12.38
- Colors: Royal blue and white
- Mascot: Blue Devil, Lil Blue
- Team name: Blue Devils
- Website: www.pcsd.org/phs/

Plattsmouth High School is a public high school located in Plattsmouth, Nebraska, United States. It enrolls roughly 500 students. Its previous location was located on Main Street. It shared the building with the Middle School (located on the lower levels) until later moving into its next location (the building that is now the middle school) in the late 1970s. Plattsmouth High School has had its current location since January 1997.

== Athletics ==
The school is part of the Trailblazer Conference. They joined the conference over the 2020 summer. Plattsmouth's athletics program offers baseball, basketball, cross country, football, golf, softball, track, volleyball, and wrestling.

The boys' cross country team won state championships in 1973, 1974, and 1975; the girls' cross country team, in 1993, 1994, and 2000. The boys' track team won state championships in 1976 and 2008. The wrestling team won a state championship in 1990, and a dual state championship in 2016. The football team won the district title in 2009 and 2010.

== In media ==
A scene in the independent film April Showers was filmed in the school.
