= Plattsmouth, Nebraska =

- City
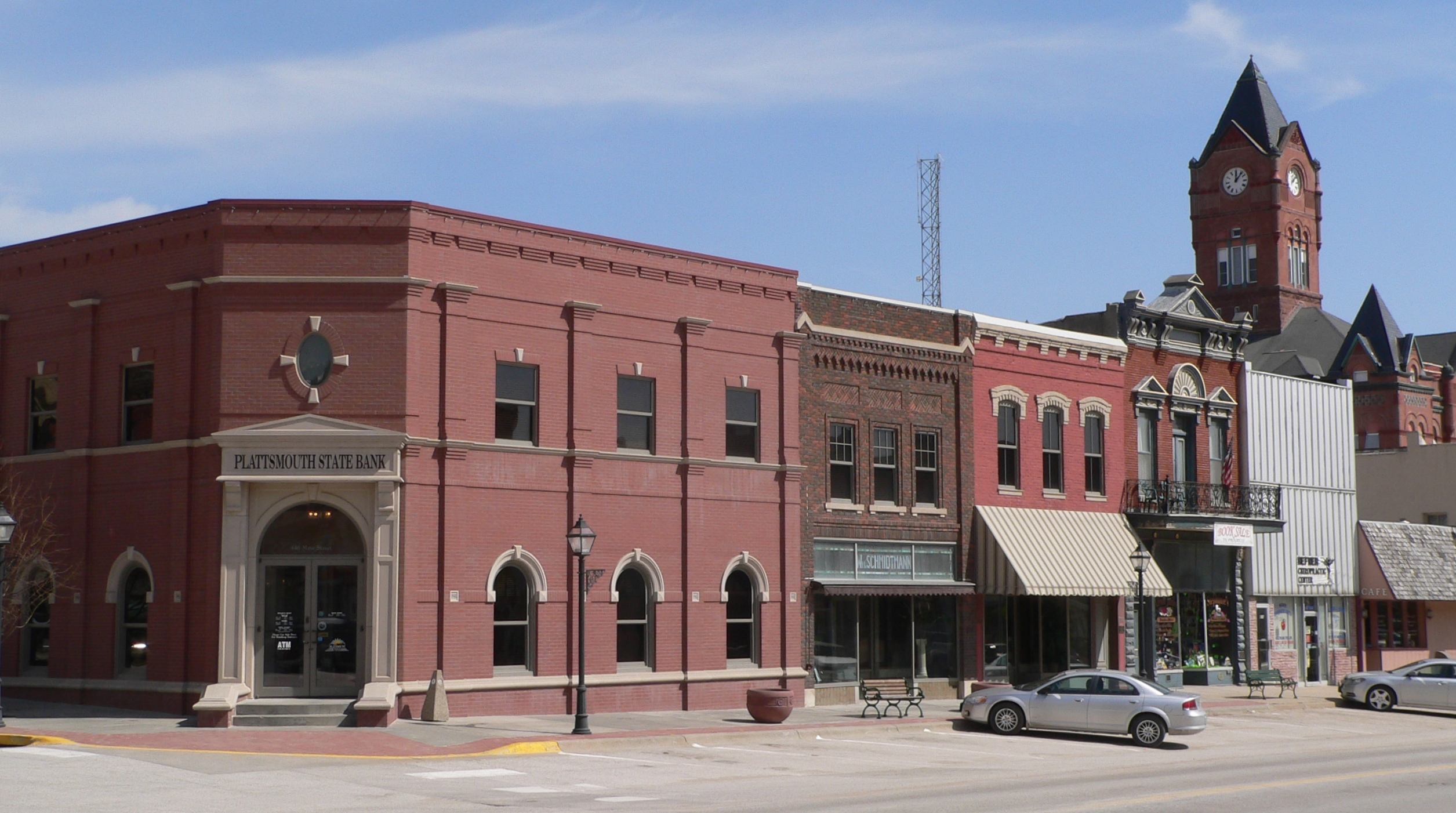
- The Plattsmouth Main Street Historic District is listed in the National Register of Historic Places. At upper right is the clock tower of the Cass County Courthouse.

- Location of Plattsmouth, Nebraska
- Coordinates: 41°00′19″N 95°53′38″W
- Country: United States
- State: Nebraska
- County: Cass
- Incorporated: 1855

Area
  - Total: 3.32 sq mi (8.60 km^{2})
  - Land: 3.31 sq mi (8.58 km^{2})
  - Water: 0.0077 sq mi (0.02 km^{2})
- Elevation: 1,050 ft (320 m)

Population (2020)
  - Total: 6,544
  - Density: 1,975.5/sq mi (762.75/km^{2})
- Time zone: UTC-6 (Central (CST))
  - Summer (DST): UTC-5 (CDT)
- ZIP code: 68048
- Area code: 402
- FIPS code: 31-39345
- GNIS feature ID: 2396229
- Website: www.plattsmouth.org

Plattsmouth is a city in and the county seat of Cass County, Nebraska, United States. The population was 6,620 at the 2020 census.

== History ==
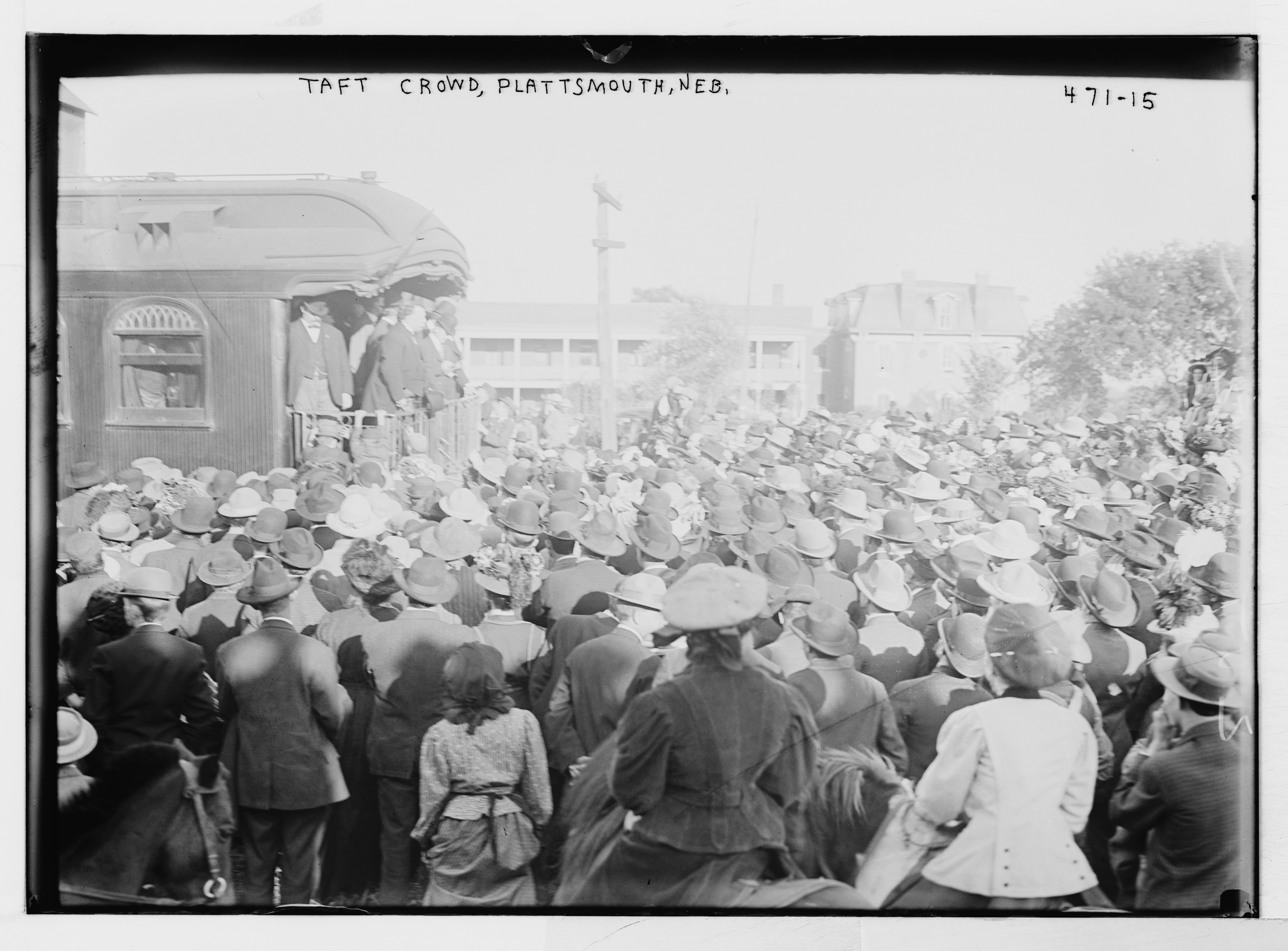
A crowd gathered in Plattsmouth during President William Howard Taft's 1908 campaign visit.

The area that would become Plattsmouth was long inhabited by the Otoe tribe before European exploration. In 1739, French explorers Pierre and Paul Mallet reached the confluence of the Platte and Missouri rivers while traveling westward. In 1848, Libeas T. Coon established a ferry across the Missouri River to convey Mormon emigrants traveling westward to Utah.

The Lewis and Clark Expedition passed the mouth of the Platte River, just north of what is now Main Street Plattsmouth, on July 21, 1804.

Between 1850 and 1860, during the golden age of Missouri River steamboating, numerous side-wheelers and stern-wheelers docked at Plattsmouth near the foot of what is now 3rd and Main Streets, affording nearly daily service to the town. The Missouri River was crossed by ferryboats until 1880, when a rail bridge was constructed across the river.

Plattsmouth first appeared in 1854 as "the Barracks", a trading post established by Sam Martin, owner of the Platteville ferry in neighboring Mills County, Iowa, ferryman Wheatley Mickelwait, and Glenwood, Iowa attorney and politician Colonel Joseph Longworthy Sharp. The community was renamed Plattsmouth for its location at the mouth of the Platte River, and was incorporated on March 15, 1855.

The organization of the city under the charter of March 1855 was effected December 29, 1856, by the election of Wheatley Mickelwait to the Mayoralty, and Enos Williams, W. M. Slaughter and Jacob Vallery, Aldermen. This Council met and proceeded to business on January 29, 1857, their first ordinance, approved by the Mayor March 2, 1857, levying a tax of one-half of 1 per cent on all taxable property within the corporate limits of the city of Plattsmouth, the amount collected to be expended in the improvement of the streets and alleys and steamboat landings at and in the city. On December 7, 1857, the Council voted each member an annual salary of $100, being something over $16 apiece for each session held during the year. This is a noticeable fact, in view of the action taken by the succeeding Council on December 30, 1858, in ordaining that the Mayor and Alderman receive for their services during that year the sum of 5 cents each, payable in city scrip; the Assessor, Recorder and Treasurer being paid $25 apiece for the same term.

The Burlington and Missouri River Railroad arrived in Plattsmouth in 1869, transforming the city into a major rail hub. The town served as a stagecoach stop on the route between Ottumwa, Iowa and Kearney, Nebraska, and as a terminus and shipping point for lumber and supplies from the east and cattle and grain from the west. In 1891, the Missouri Pacific Railroad extended north-south rail service to the city. Between 1890 and 1940, Plattsmouth was home to Burlington railroad roundhouses and machine shops that at one time employed as many as 800 workers, and the city's population grew to nearly 10,000 residents. During the 1930s, the Burlington Refrigerator & Express Company began operations in Plattsmouth. In the mid-1960s, the Burlington Shops closed and employees retired or were transferred to the company's Lincoln, Nebraska facilities. The site of the former roundhouses and railroad equipment is now occupied by Rhylander Park, which includes commemorative railroad memorabilia honoring this chapter of the city's history.

The Romanesque-style Cass County Courthouse, built in 1891 and designed by Lincoln architect William Gray, anchors the downtown area. The city's Plattsmouth Main Street Historic District is listed on the National Register of Historic Places and encompasses 45 buildings, bounded by Third, Seventh, and Main Streets and Avenue A. The district is comprised primarily of two-story masonry buildings of commercial Italianate design and is considered one of the oldest commercial streets in Nebraska.

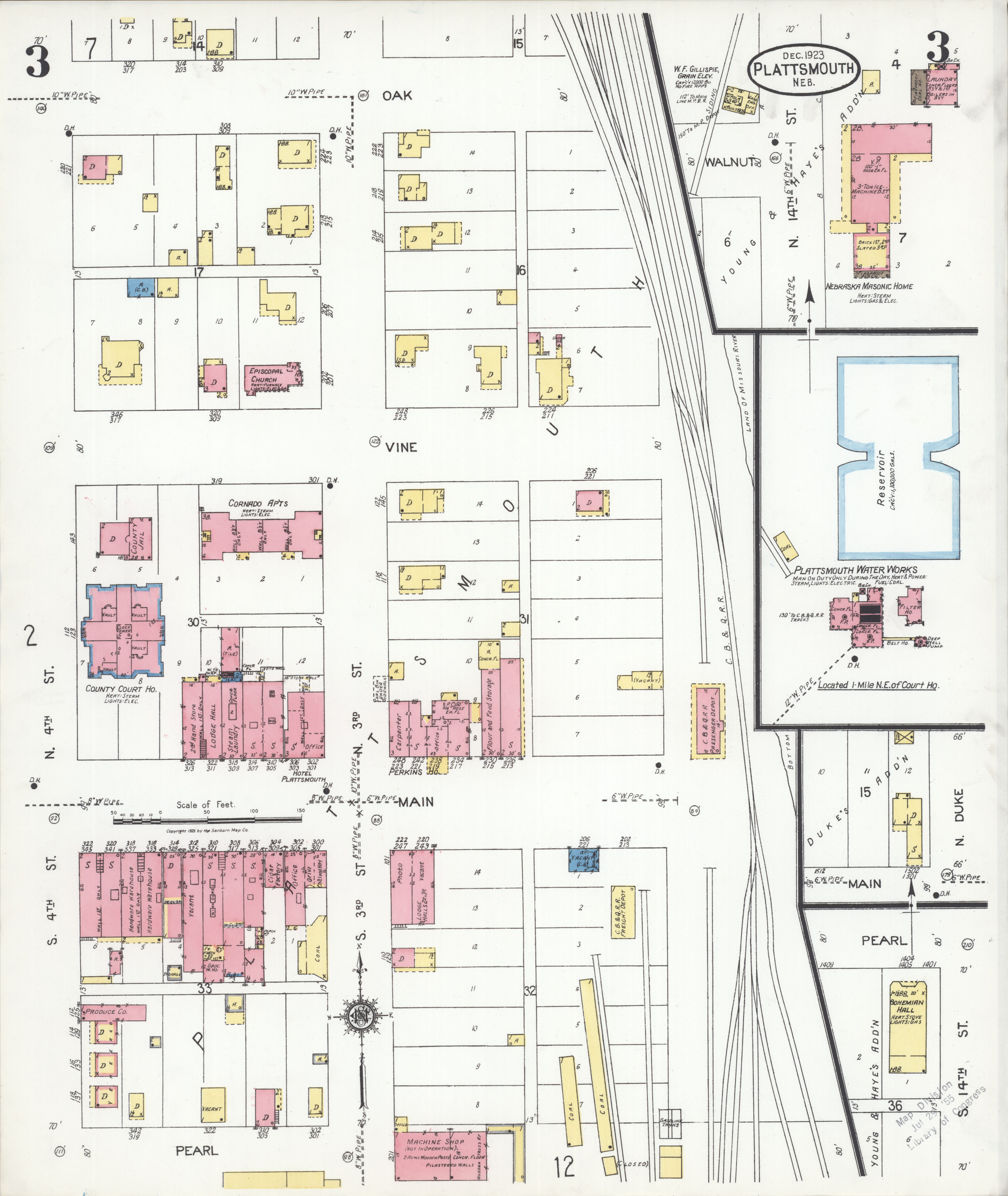
1923 Sanborn Fire Insurance Map showing the layout of downtown Plattsmouth.

== Geography ==
According to the United States Census Bureau, the city has a total area of 3.11 square miles (8.05 km^{2}), of which 3.10 square miles (8.03 km^{2}) is land and 0.01 square miles (0.03 km^{2}) is water.

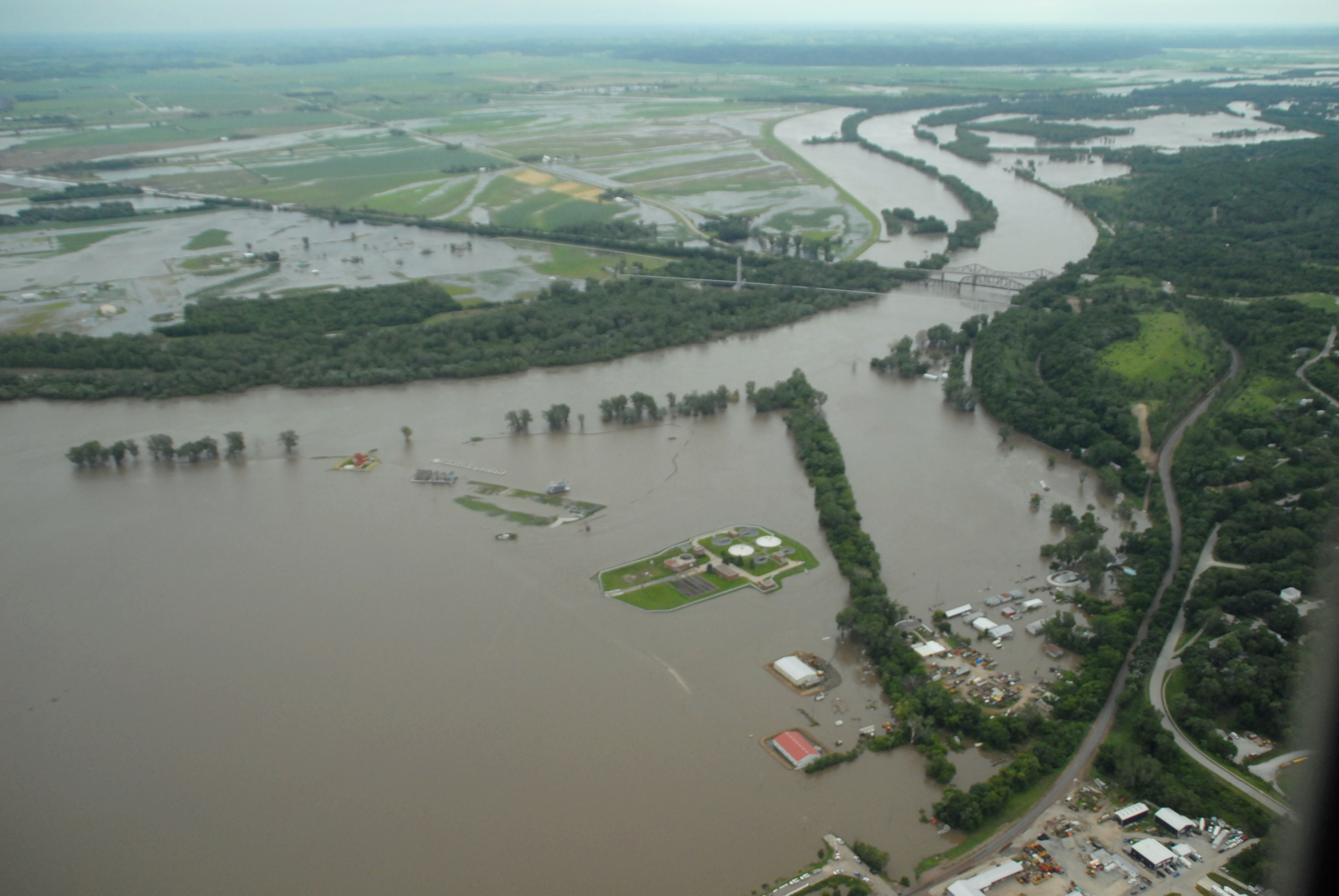
Plattsmouth bridges on June 22, 2011, during the 2011 Missouri River floods

== Demographics ==
Historical population
Census	Pop.	Note	%±
1860	474		—
1870	1,944		310.1%
1880	4,175		114.8%
1890	8,392		101.0%
1900	4,964		−40.8%
1910	4,287		−13.6%
1920	4,190		−2.3%
1930	3,793		−9.5%
1940	4,268		12.5%
1950	4,874		14.2%
1960	6,244		28.1%
1970	6,371		2.0%
1980	6,295		−1.2%
1990	6,412		1.9%
2000	6,887		7.4%
2010	6,502		−5.6%
2020	6,544		0.6%
2021 (est.)	6,620		1.2%
U.S. Decennial Census; 2012 Estimate

=== 2020 census ===
As of the 2020 census, Plattsmouth had a population of 6,544. There were 2,585 households and 1,517 families in the city. The population density was 1,977.0 per square mile (763.3/km^{2}).

The median age was 38.4 years. 24.2% of residents were under the age of 18 and 17.7% were 65 years of age or older. For every 100 females there were 100.4 males, and for every 100 females age 18 and over there were 97.8 males.

99.3% of residents lived in urban areas, while 0.7% lived in rural areas.

There were 2,858 housing units, of which 9.6% were vacant. The homeowner vacancy rate was 2.2% and the rental vacancy rate was 10.6%. Of the 2,585 households, 32.3% had children under the age of 18 living in them. Of all households, 43.6% were married-couple households, 20.6% were households with a male householder and no spouse or partner present, and 27.7% were households with a female householder and no spouse or partner present. About 30.9% of all households were made up of individuals and 14.1% had someone living alone who was 65 years of age or older. The average household size was 2.4 and the average family size was 3.0.

Racial composition as of the 2020 census
Race	Number	Percent
White	5,875	89.8%
Black or African American	30	0.5%
American Indian and Alaska Native	30	0.5%
Asian	26	0.4%
Native Hawaiian and Other Pacific Islander	2	0.0%
Some other race	170	2.6%
Two or more races	411	6.3%
Hispanic or Latino (of any race)	421	6.4%

=== Income and poverty ===
The 2016–2020 5-year American Community Survey estimates show that the median household income was $50,680 (with a margin of error of +/- $5,806) and the median family income $59,375 (+/- $7,892). Males had a median income of $38,958 (+/- $4,911) versus $26,262 (+/- $4,383) for females. The median income for those above 16 years old was $32,701 (+/- $3,685). Approximately, 7.1% of families and 10.0% of the population were below the poverty line, including 7.5% of those under the age of 18 and 10.9% of those ages 65 or over.

=== 2010 census ===
As of the census of 2010, there were 6,502 people, 2,525 households, and 1,620 families living in the city. The population density was 2,097.4 inhabitants per square mile (809.8/km^{2}). There were 2,863 housing units at an average density of 923.5 units per square mile (356.6 units/km^{2}). The racial makeup of the city was 95.3% White, 0.6% African American, 0.4% Native American, 0.2% Asian, 0.2% Pacific Islander, 1.0% from other races, and 2.3% from two or more races. Hispanic or Latino of any race were 4.0% of the population.

There were 2,525 households, of which 34.9% had children under the age of 18 living with them, 46.9% were married couples living together, 12.2% had a female householder with no husband present, 5.1% had a male householder with no wife present, and 35.8% were non-families. 30.5% of all households were made up of individuals, and 13.3% had someone living alone who was 65 years of age or older. The average household size was 2.48 and the average family size was 3.09.

The median age in the city was 36.5 years. 26.6% of residents were under the age of 18; 7.8% were between the ages of 18 and 24; 26.5% were from 25 to 44; 24.4% were from 45 to 64; and 14.7% were 65 years of age or older. The gender makeup of the city was 49.4% male and 50.6% female.

=== 2000 census ===
As of the census of 2000, there were 6,887 people, 2,618 households, and 1,780 families living in the city. The population density was 2,381.6 inhabitants per square mile (919.5/km^{2}). There were 2,805 housing units at an average density of 970.0 units per square mile (374.5 units/km^{2}). The racial makeup of the city was 97.36% White, 0.30% African American, 0.51% Native American, 0.52% Asian, 0.01% Pacific Islander, 0.46% from other races, and 0.83% from two or more races. Hispanic or Latino of any race were 2.00% of the population.

There were 2,618 households, out of which 37.4% had children under the age of 18 living with them, 51.6% were married couples living together, 11.8% had a female householder with no husband present, and 32.0% were non-families. 27.0% of all households were made up of individuals, and 12.0% had someone living alone who was 65 years of age or older. The average household size was 2.56 and the average family size was 3.10.

In the city, the population was spread out, with 29.1% under the age of 18, 8.8% from 18 to 24, 29.5% from 25 to 44, 18.8% from 45 to 64, and 13.9% who were 65 years of age or older. The median age was 33 years. For every 100 females, there were 92.5 males. For every 100 females age 18 and over, there were 87.0 males.

As of 2000 the median income for a household in the city was $38,844, and the median income for a family was $43,425. Males had a median income of $32,702 versus $22,032 for females. The per capita income for the city was $17,153. About 6.5% of families and 7.0% of the population were below the poverty line, including 10.0% of those under age 18 and 5.5% of those age 65 or over.

== Economy ==
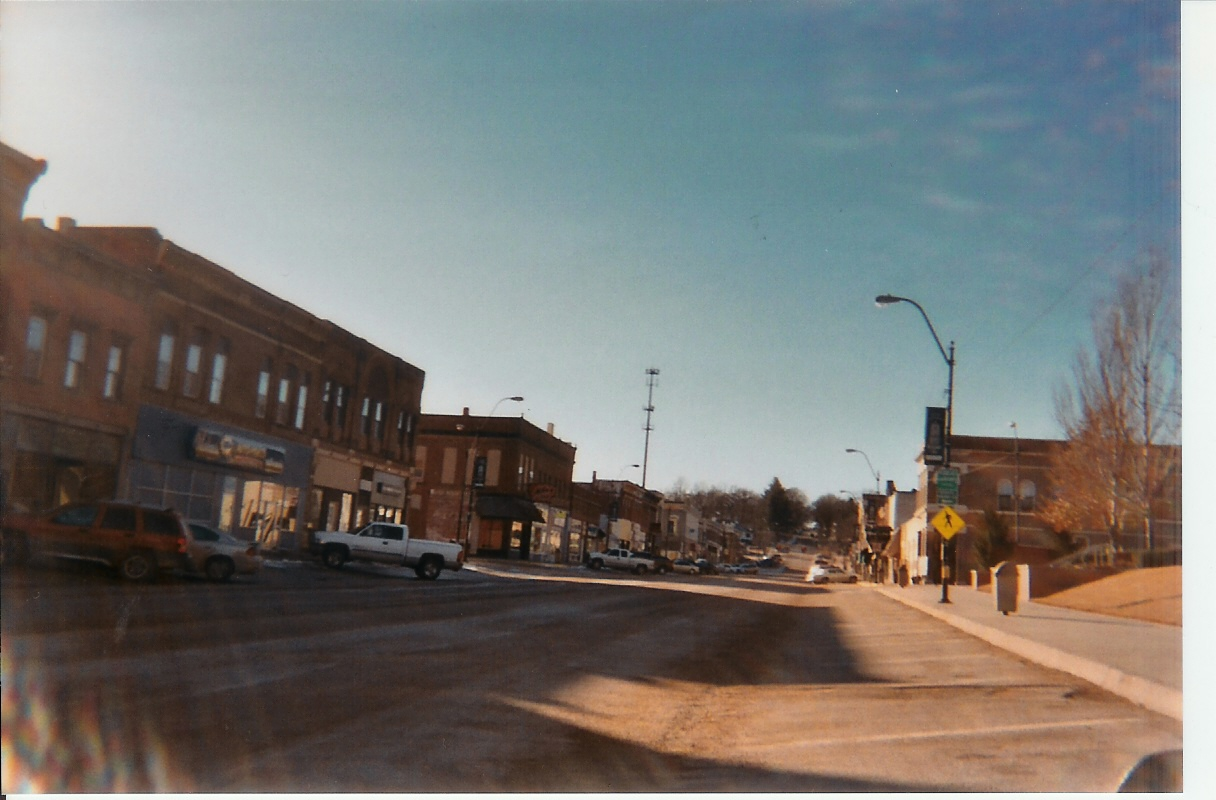
Downtown Plattsmouth looking west along Main Street (2009).

Plattsmouth's economy has historically been shaped by its location at the confluence of the Platte and Missouri Rivers and its role as a railroad center. During the height of the Burlington and Missouri River Railroad era (1890–1940), the railroad's roundhouses and machine shops were the city's dominant employer, supporting a workforce of up to 800 men and a population that at one time approached 10,000 residents. The closure of the Burlington Shops in the mid-1960s prompted significant economic restructuring.

Today, Plattsmouth's economy is anchored by healthcare, manufacturing, and retail trade. The city is located approximately 20 miles (32 km) south of Omaha along U.S. Route 75, which provides businesses access to the broader metropolitan market. Retail trade accounts for a significant share of Cass County's economic activity, with the county recording approximately $68 million in net retail sales in 2019. Healthcare and social assistance are major employment sectors; the Masonic Home of Nebraska, a senior living facility located in Plattsmouth, is among the city's largest employers.

BNSF Railway continues to operate active freight lines through the area via the historic Missouri River rail bridge constructed in 1880, supporting agricultural and industrial shipments throughout the region. The surrounding Cass County agricultural economy, centered on corn and soybean production, also contributes to the local economy.

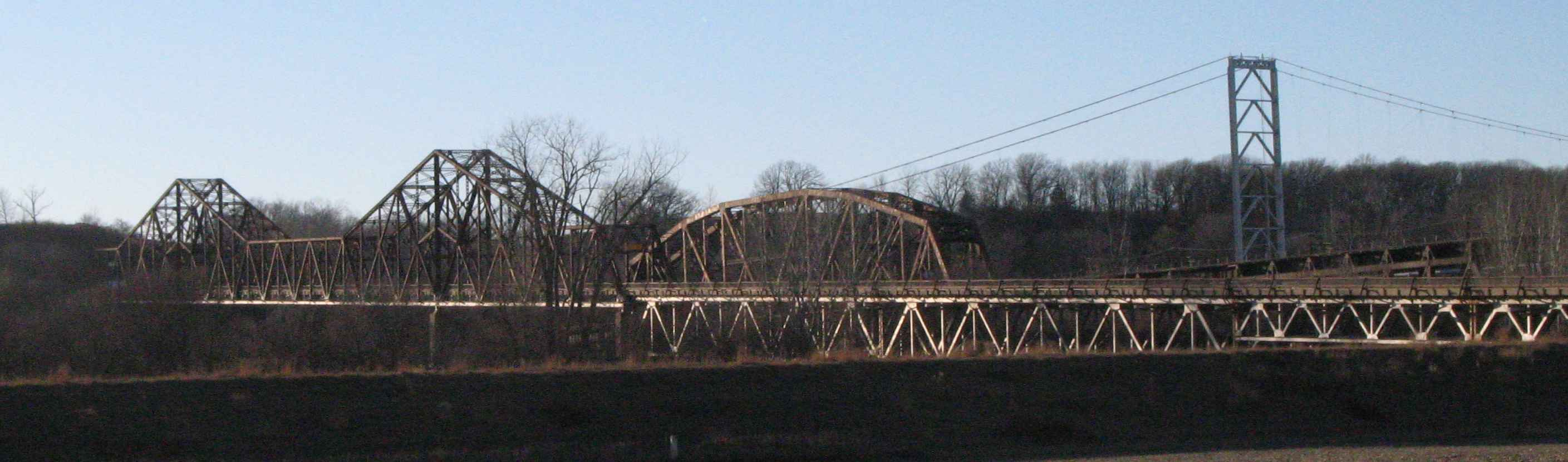
The Plattsmouth Bridge over the Missouri River, built in 1929, is listed on the National Register of Historic Places and continues to serve as a toll crossing linking Nebraska and Iowa.

== Education ==
=== Public schools ===
The Plattsmouth Community Schools district (District 13) serves the city and surrounding area. The first school supported by public funds in Plattsmouth was established in 1857 by Mr. and Mrs. J.P. Gorrell, and the first public Board of Education was elected in 1868. The district enrolls approximately 1,459 students across four schools and maintains a student-to-teacher ratio of 13:1.

The district operates the Plattsmouth Early Childhood Center, Plattsmouth Elementary School (grades K–4), Plattsmouth Community Middle School (grades 5–8), and Plattsmouth High School. The high school offers more than 130 courses for approximately 490 students, including honors and Advanced Placement courses and a Wall-to-Wall Career Academies program in which students select from three career-related tracks beginning in their freshman year. Plattsmouth High School was the first school in Nebraska to offer both a High School of Business program and a High School Diesel Mechanic program, and in 2018 received the Rule 57 School of the Year award from the Nebraska Department of Education. The district is accredited through NCA AdvancED.

=== Private schools ===
Two private schools also operate in Plattsmouth: First Baptist School and St. John the Baptist School, a Roman Catholic school affiliated with Church of the Holy Spirit Catholic Parish.

=== Library ===
The Plattsmouth Public Library was founded in 1916 as a Carnegie Corporation Library.

== Notable people ==
- Hazel Abel, U.S. Senator
- Raymond Chandler, detective fiction writer
- John Philip Falter, artist
- Oscar Graham, baseball player
- Paul Newlan, actor
- John O'Rourke, businessman, Wisconsin state legislator, mayor of Plattsmouth; O'Rourke was the subject of the American Civil War song: When Johnny Comes Marching Home

== See also ==
- Omaha Southern Railroad
