= List of ghost towns in Nebraska =

This is an incomplete list of ghost towns in Nebraska.

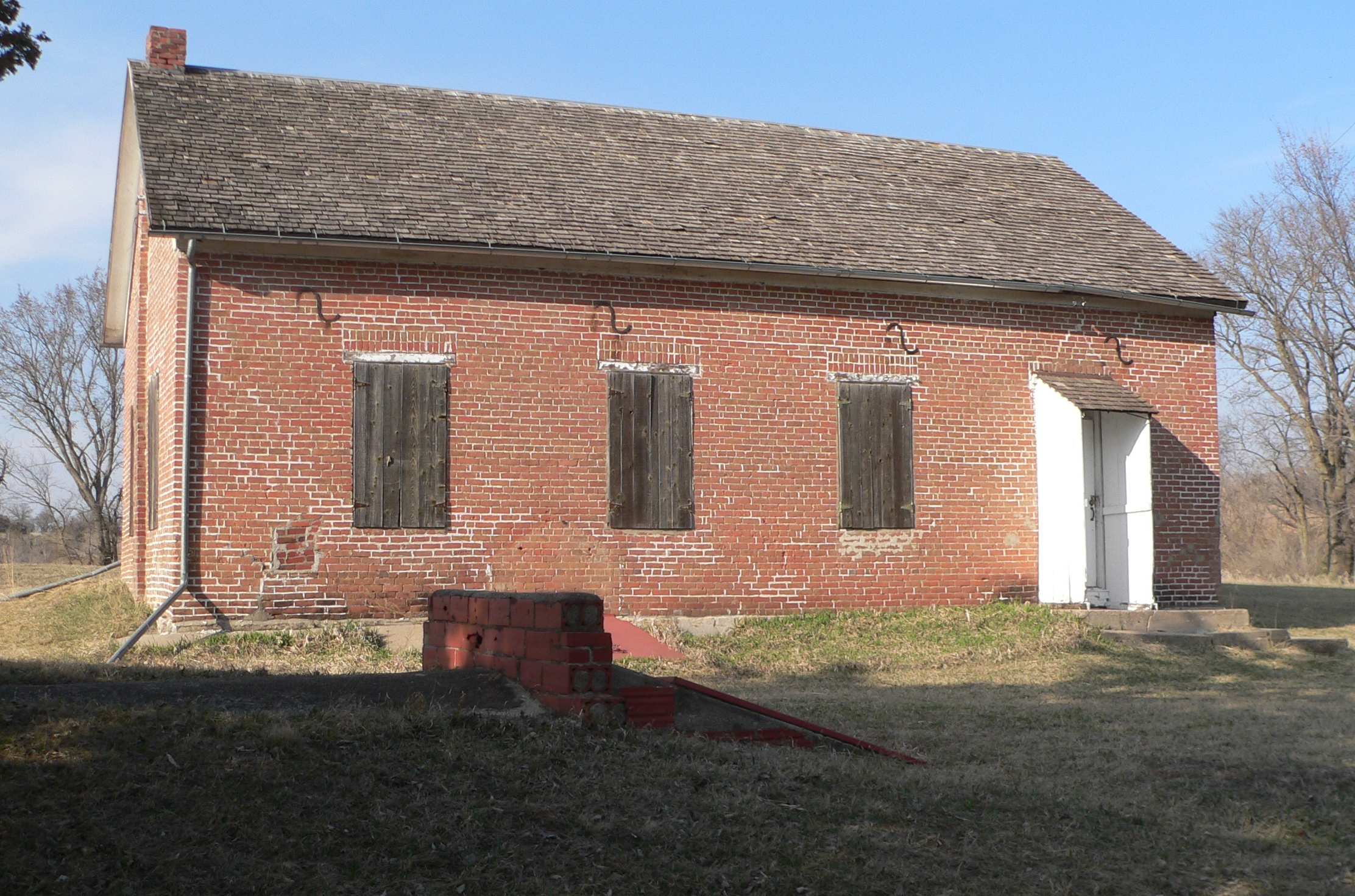
Rock Bluff School, formerly the Naomi Institute, Rock Bluff, Nebraska

== Ghost towns ==
Town name	Other name(s)	County	Established	Disestablished	Remarks
Abdal		Nuckolls			
Ames	Ketchum	Dodge			Not a full ghost town. Population of 14 as of the 2020 census.
Andrews		Sioux	1906	1951	Source may be a bit flimsy due to it being self-made.
Angora	Antelope Hill	Morrill	1900		
Anoka		Boyd			
Antioch		Sheridan	1891		
Appleton		Pawnee			
Arago	Fargo	Richardson	1860		Some people claim that Fargo and Arago were separate communities. This statement needs further research to be proven.
Armour		Pawnee	1890	1934	
Ashford		Banner			Temporary county seat for Banner County in 1889
Bayonne		Cherry			
Belmont	Evergreen City	Dawes			
Bluevale	Blue Valley	York			
Bookwalter		Pawnee			
Bowen		Washington	1886		
Bower	Bowerville	Jefferson			
Breslau		Pierce			
Brewster		Blaine			County seat of Blaine County. Not a full ghost town, population of 17. Bunk'd character Finn Sawyer, portrayed by actor Will Buie Jr, is from Brewster, Nebraska (in the series). This is confirmed in the season 3 episode, "We Can't Bear It!".
Brocksburg		Keya Paha			
Burton		Keya Paha			
Carns		Keya Paha			
Charlestown		York			
Cincinnati		Pawnee			
Covington	Harney City	Dakota			
Crouse		Lancaster			Now Branched Oak State Recreation Area.
Dale		Custer			
De Soto		Washington			
DeWitty	Audacious	Cherry			
Dobytown		Kearney			
Donald		Hooker			
Duff		Rock			
Dunwell		Hooker			
Dyson Hollow Lime Kiln		Sarpy			
Eclipse		Hooker	circa 1913		First white man in Hooker County born in Eclipse.
Edholm		Butler			
Elsmere		Cherry			
Elton		Custer			
Elvira		Merrick		Once the county seat of Merrick County	
Factoryville	Union Mills	Cass			
Flats		McPherson			
Friedensau		Thayer			
Glen		Sioux			
Glencoe		Dodge			
Gross		Boyd			Near ghost town.
Hayland		Adams			
Hecla		Hooker			
Homerville		Gosper			
Hope		Scotts Bluff			Several Jewish and Black people lived there alongside white people. The town was named "Hope" after the hope they had in the community.
Ingham		Lincoln			
Jacksonville					
Jamaica		Lancaster			
Kelso		Hooker			
Koesterville		Pawnee			
Lakeland		Brown			
Lee Park		Custer and Valley			
Lemoyne		Keith			
Letan		Box Butte			
Linton					
Lomax		Custer			
Lynn		Morrill			
Mariaville		Rock			
Mars	Jessup	Knox			
Marsland		Dawes			
Martha		Holt			
Mayberry		Pawnee			
Meadville		Keya Paha			
Melrose		Harlan			
Meridian	Big Sandy	Jefferson			
Minersville	Otoe City	Otoe			
Mission Creek		Pawnee			
Monowi		Boyd			A near ghost town with 1 resident, Elsie Eiler, as of 2010. Monowi has been in ad campaigns with Coca-Cola, Arby's, and Prudential Financial. They won a world record for biggest advertisement sign made.
Montrose		Sioux			
Mud Springs		Morrill			
Neapolis		Saunders			
New Home					
Nonpareil		Box Butte			
North Summerfield		Pawnee			
Omadi		Dakota	1856		
Oreapolis		Cass	1859	1864	
Pauline		Adams	1887		
Pebble		Dodge			
Pishelville		Knox	1874		
Pittsburg		Seward			
Pleasant Hill	Pleasanthill	Saline			
Pleasant Valley		Dodge			
Ringgold	Ringold	Dawson			
Rock Bluff		Cass			
Royal		Antelope			
Saltillo		Lancaster			
Sartoria		Buffalo			
Savannah		Butler			
Shafferville		Pawnee			
Scott's Valley		Pawnee			
Sedan		Nuckolls			
Shea		Jefferson			
Speiser		Richardson			
Spiker		Washington			
Spring Ranch	Springranch, Spring Ranche	Clay			
St. Deroin	Saint Deroin	Nemaha			
Tate		Pawnee			
Tipp's Branch		Pawnee			
Unit		Sioux			
Venus		Knox			
Violet	Butler	Pawnee			
Wee Town	Wee	Pierce			
Weir		Hooker			
Weissert		Custer			
Wheeler	Baird	Wheeler			
