= Armour (disambiguation) =

Armour (British spelling) or Armor (American spelling) is protective covering.

Armour or Armor may also refer to:

== Military and naval ==
- Armoured forces
- An armoured fighting vehicle
- Vehicle armour, protection for vehicles or warships
- The metal belt armor, deck armor, turret armor, and command citadel armor of battleship and cruisers
- Personal armor, protection for individuals
- Armor-piercing shot and shell, munitions designed to penetrate armor
- SS Armour, a steamboat operating on the Magnetawan River in Ontario

== Protection or technology ==
- ARMOR Doppler Weather Radar
- Armor (hydrology), beaches, stream or river beds which have significant rock or boulder occurrence
- Armour (anatomy), anatomical body protection
- Armour Thyroid (or Armour brand medication), a thyroid supplement made of desiccated thyroid extract from pigs

== Places ==
- Armour, Nebraska, an extinct town in Pawnee County
- Armour, South Dakota, a city in and the county seat of Douglas County
- Armour, Ontario, a township
- Côtes-d'Armor, Breton for "by the sea" and means the part of Brittany on or near the coast
- Armorica, an old name for Brittany, France
- Armor, New York

== People ==
- Armour (surname)

== Organizations ==
- Armour and Company, slaughterhouse and meat packers
- Armour Mission, a charitable organization founded by Philip Danforth Armour
- Armour Institute of Technology (1893), merged with Illinois Institute of Technology in 1940

== Media and entertainment ==
- Armor (novel), by John Steakley
- Armor (magazine), journal of the U.S. Army's Armor Branch
- Armor (comics), Marvel Comics character
- Armored (film), 2009, directed by Nimrod Antal
- Armor (film), film starring Sylvester Stallone
- Armor (album), by Janus
- A.R.M.O.R., Altered-Reality Monitoring and Operational Response, a sister organization to S.H.I.E.L.D. in the Marvel Comics universe
- "Armor", a song by Ronnie Radke from the 2014 mixtape Watch Me
- Armor, a 2018 album by Sara Bareilles
- "Armour" (Samantha Jade song), 2015
- "Armour" (Craig David song)
- Armour (Keyser), a painting by Ragnhild Keyser
- Armored (novel), a novel by Mark Greaney

== See also ==
- Under Armour
- Chain mail
