= Bayonne (disambiguation) =

Bayonne is a city and commune in France.

Bayonne may also refer to:

== Places ==
=== Europe ===
- Arrondissement of Bayonne, an arrondissement of France
- Bayonne, Spain, a municipality in Spain often referred to by its Galician name, Baiona

=== United States ===
- Bayonne, Nebraska, an unincorporated community in Nebraska, U.S.
- Bayonne, New Jersey, a city in New Jersey, U.S.
- Bayonne Bridge, connecting New Jersey and Staten Island, New York, U.S.

=== Dominican Republic ===
- Bayona, a neighborhood in Santo Domingo, Dominican Republic.

== People with the surname ==
- Pierre Bayonne (born 1949), Haitian footballer

== Other uses ==
- Bayonne (musician), a musician from Austin, Texas

== See also ==
- Battle of Bayonne, 1814
- Gare de Bayonne, a railway station in Bayonne, France
- Bayonne ham
- Baiona (disambiguation)
- Biarritz – Anglet – Bayonne Airport
