= Tarbell Creek =

Stream in Nebraska, U.S.

Tarbell Creek Tributary to Niobrara River
- Location of Tarbell Creek mouth Tarbell Creek (the United States)

Location
- Country: United States
- State: Nebraska
- County: Keya Paha

Physical characteristics
- Source: Spring Creek divide
  - location: about 4 miles northwest of Carns, Nebraska
  - coordinates: 42°46′29.01″N 099°32′0.41″W
  - elevation: 2,310 ft (700 m)
- Mouth: Niobrara River
  - location: about 0.5 miles west of Carns, Nebraska
  - coordinates: 42°43′55.01″N 099°30′24.41″W
  - elevation: 1,880 ft (570 m)
- Length: 3.77 mi (6.07 km)
- Basin size: 3.18 square miles (8.2 km^{2})
- Discharge
  - location: Niobrara River
  - average: 0.42 cu ft/s (0.012 m^{3}/s) at mouth with Niobrara River

Basin features
- Progression: Niobrara River → Missouri River → Mississippi
- River system: Niobrara
- Bridges: none

Tarbell Creek is a 3.77 mi (6.07 km) long second-order tributary to the Niobrara River in Keya Paha County, Nebraska. This is the only "creek" of this name in the United States. There are two "brooks", with the name of Tarbell Brook, one in New England and the other in New York.

Tarbell Creek rises on the divide of Spring Creek and then flows generally southeast to join the Niobrara River about 0.5 miles (0.80 km) west of Carns, Nebraska.

== Watershed ==
Tarbell Creek drains 3.18 square miles (8.2 km^{2}) of area, receives about 23.3 in/year (59 cm/year) of precipitation, and is about 56.18% forested.

== See also ==
- List of rivers of Nebraska
