= Arborville, Nebraska =

Unincorporated community in Nebraska, U.S.

Coordinates: 41°01′22″N 97°46′28″W

Arborville is an unincorporated community in York County, Nebraska, United States.

== History ==
A post office was established at Arborville in 1874, and remained until 1943. Arborville was named from the trees planted by its founder.
