= Armour (zoology) =

Anatomical feature

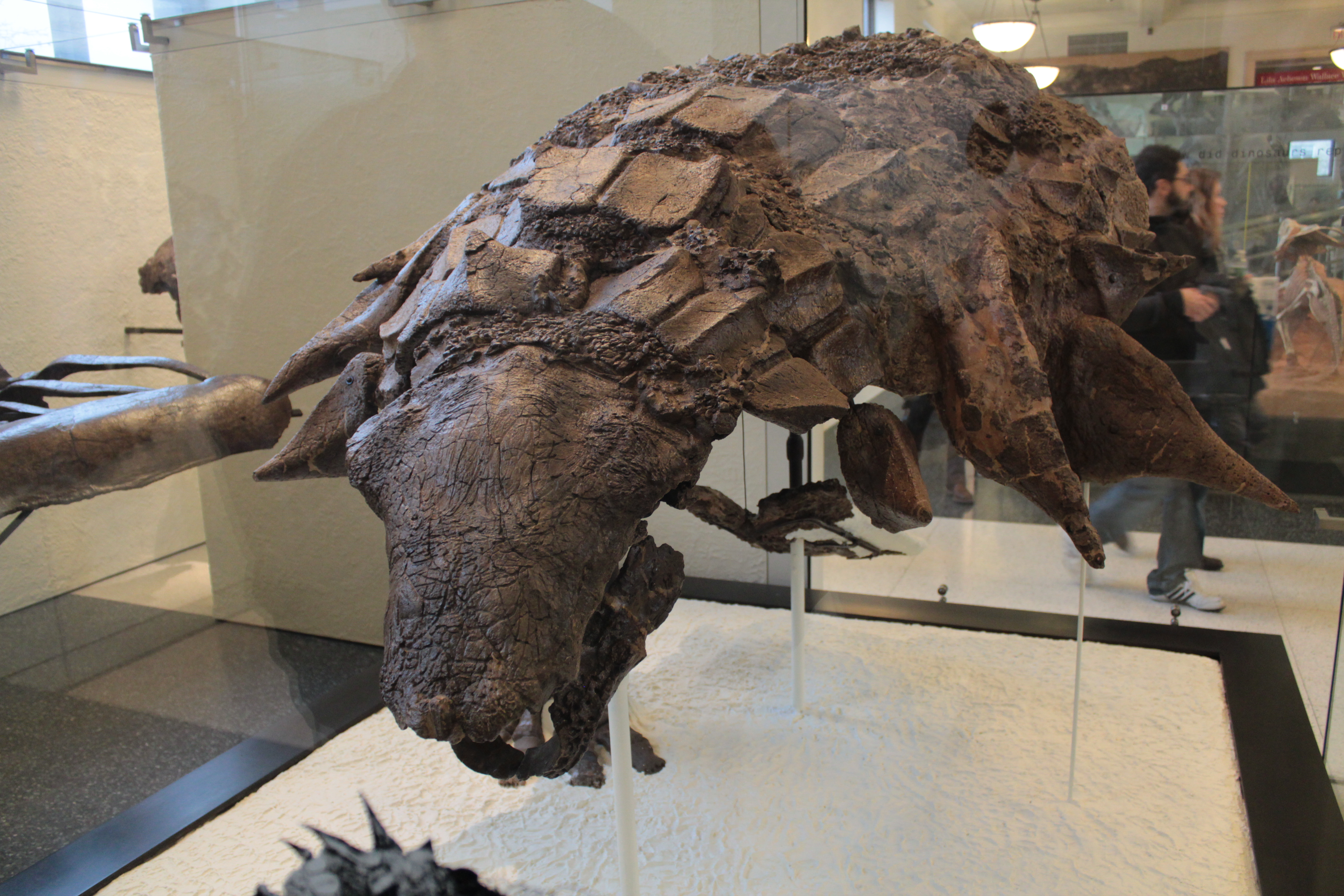
Fossilized armour of Edmontonia, specimen AMNH 5665

Armor or armour in animals is a rigid cuticle or exoskeleton that provides exterior protection against attack by predators, formed as part of the body (rather than the behavioural utilization of external objects for protection) usually through the thickening and hardening of superficial tissues, outgrowths or skin secretions. It is often found in prey species that are too slow or clumsy to outrun predators, or those that would stand their ground and fight, thus needing to protect vital organs against claw, talon or bite injuries.

== Composition ==
Armoured structures are usually composed of hardened mineral deposits, chitin, bone, or keratin.

== Species with armour ==
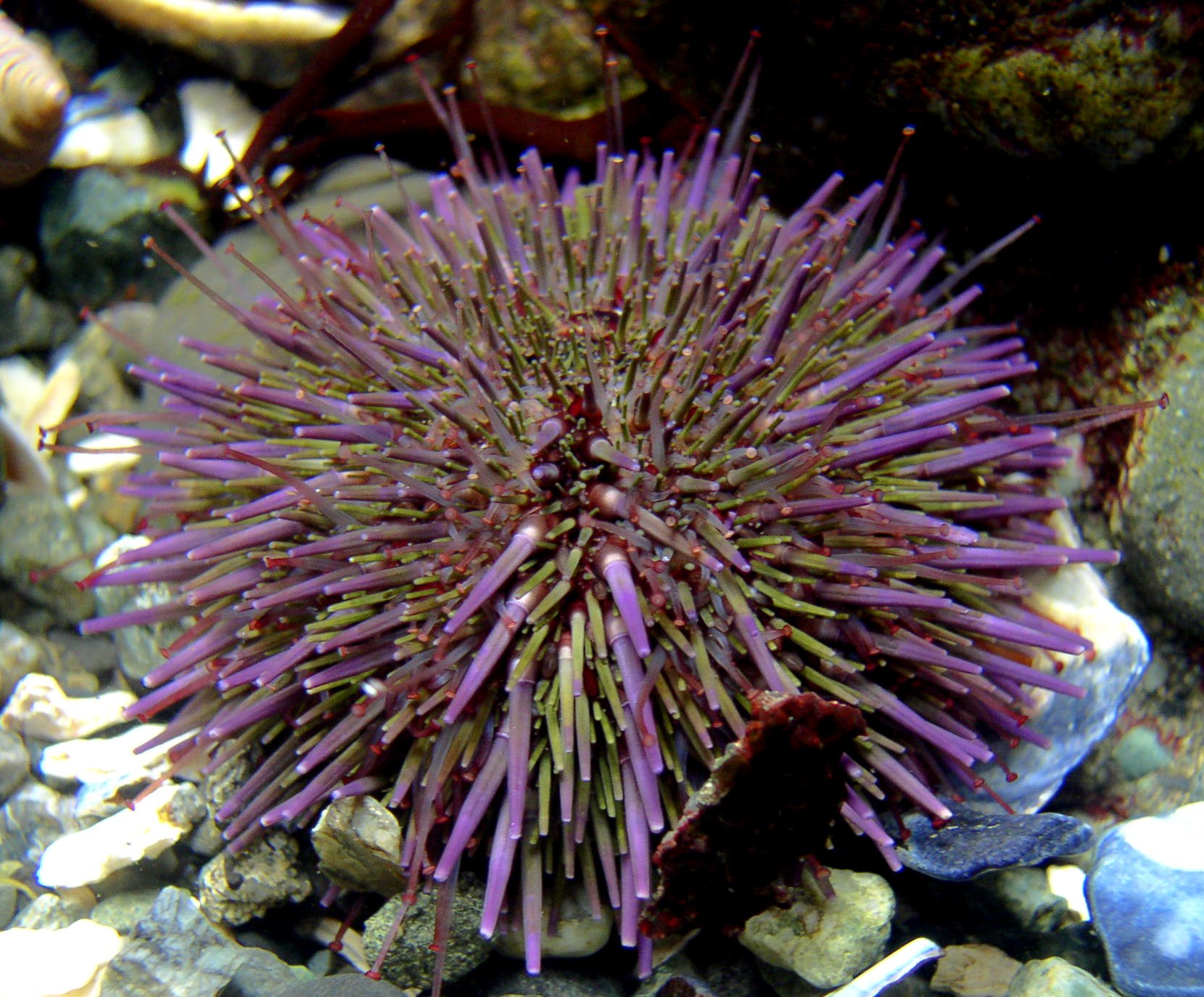
Strongylocentrotus purpuratus, a well-armoured sea urchin

Armour is evident in numerous animal species from both current and prehistoric times. Dinosaurs such as Ankylosaurus, as well as other Thyreophora (armoured dinosaurs such as Ankylosauria and Stegosauria), grew thick plate-like armour on their bodies as well as offensive armour appendages such as the thagomizer or a tail club. The armour took many forms, including osteoderms, spikes, horns, and plates. Other dinosaurs such as ceratopsian dinosaurs as well as some sauropods such as Saltasaurus, grew armour to defend themselves, although armour in sauropods overall is uncommon.

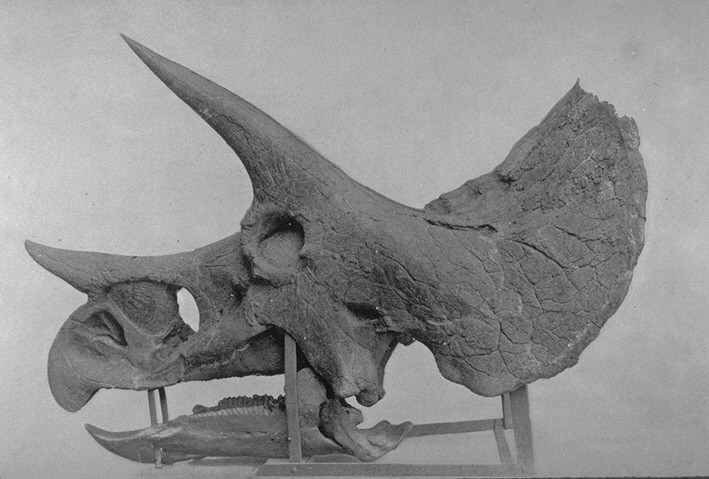
The skull of Triceratops with its large neck frill and horns, both natural armour.

In modern times, some molluscs employ the use of shells as armour, and armour is evident in the chitinous exoskeleton of arthropods. Fish use armour in the form of scales, whether 'cosmoid', 'ganoid' or 'placoid' and in some cases spines, such as on fish such as the stickleback. The chalky plate, or cuttlebone, of cuttlefish also acts as armour. Most reptiles have scaly skin which protects them from predators in addition to water retention; the crocodile's scutes and the shells of the Chelonia: tortoises, turtles and terrapins.

Numerous mammals employ the use of spines and body armour, although not as sturdy as reptilian armour, like the spines of the echidnas and of porcupines and hedgehogs. The bony shell of the armadillos and the extinct Glyptodon were very much like Ankylosaurus' armour and some modern armadillos curl up into a ball when threatened, making them unexposed due to their armour. Similarly, the hairy plate-like scales of the pangolin are employed in the same way and are constructed of the same material used in the offensive armour, the horn, of the rhinoceros.

== Usage ==
Armour, although all used for the sole intent to ward off attackers, can be split into defensive and offensive armour. Examples of offensive armour are horns, hooves, antlers, claws, beaks, clubs and pincers, as developed in some mammals, birds, reptiles (including dinosaurs, such as the dromaeosaurid claw and the ceratopsian horn) and arthropods. Offensive armour is often used in conjunction with defensive armour and in some cases makes an animal almost unassailable.

== See also ==
- Armour (disambiguation)
- Carapace
- Neck frill
- Osteoderms
- Scute
- Animal weapon
