= Crocodilian armor =

Epidermal body armor of a crocodile

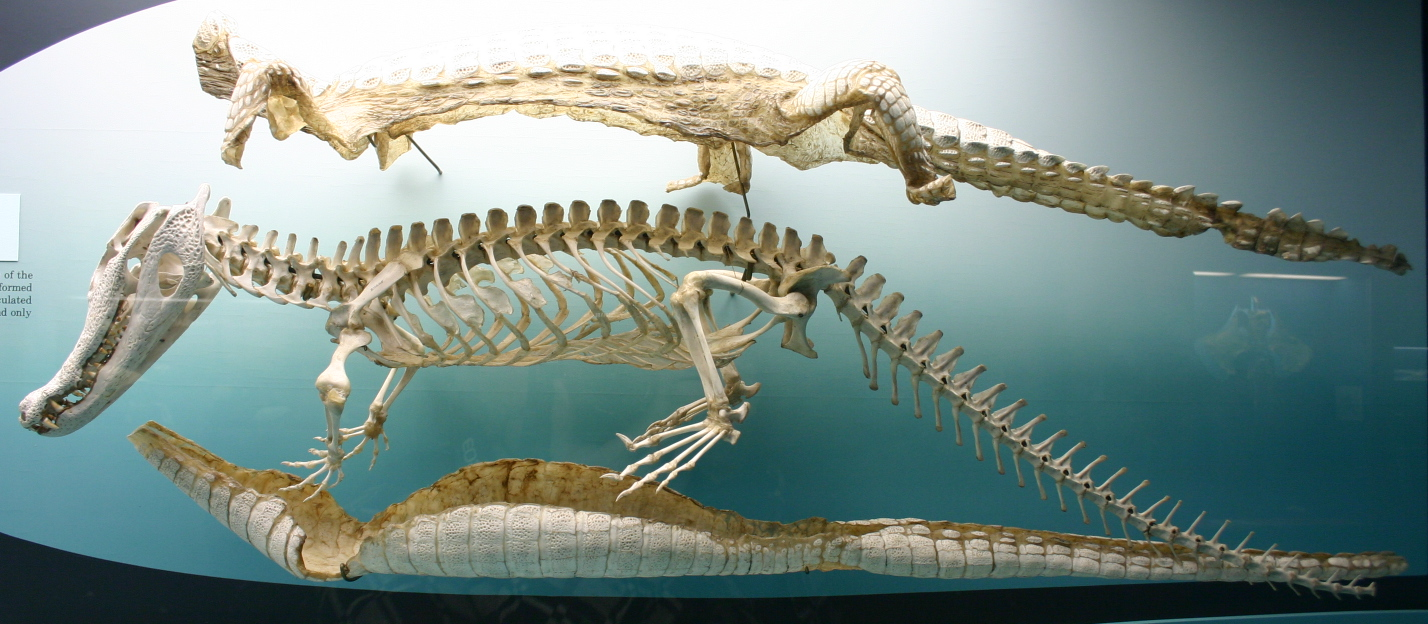
Epidermal body armour and skeleton of a black caiman (Melanosuchus niger).

Crocodilian armor consists of the protective dermal and epidermal components of the integumentary system in animals of the order Crocodilia.

== Structure and anatomy ==
The epidermal scutes of the alligator consists of oblong horny scales, arranged in transverse rows; the long axes of the scales are parallel to that of the body. On the tail, except along the mid-dorsal line, and on the ventral side of the trunk and head these scales are very regular in outline and arrangement; on the sides of the head and trunk and on the legs they are much smaller and less regularly arranged, while along the mid-dorsal line of the tail, especially in its posterior half, they are elevated into tall keels that give the tail a large surface area for swimming. The first three digits of both manus (fore foot) and pes (hind foot) are armed with horny claws, which also belong to the epidermal part of the exoskeleton.

The dermal exoskeleton consists of bony scutes known as osteoderms that underlie the epidermal scales of the dorsal surface of the trunk and anterior part of the tail. The overlying scales, except in very young animals, are always rubbed off, so that the bony scales are exposed. The ventral or inner surface of the scutes is flat, while the outer surface is strongly keeled and in old animals is often rough and pitted. The plates are nearly square in outline and are closely joined in most places.

The scutes are grouped in two fairly distinct areas known as the nuchal and the dorsal shields. The former lies just back of the head, in the region of the fore legs, and consists of four larger and a number of smaller plates. The latter, or dorsal shield, extends over the back in fairly regular longitudinal rows and quite regular transverse rows. At the widest part of the trunk there are six or eight of these scutes in one transverse row. They become smaller towards the tail.

The teeth are exoskeletal structures, partly of ectodermal, partly of dermal origin. They are conical in shape, without roots, and are replaced when lost. They will be described in connection with the skull.

Musk glands, said by Gadow to be present in all Crocodilia, are found in both sexes and are derivations of the skin. One pair, each of which may be as large as a walnut, is found on the lower side of the head, one on the inside of each half of the mandible. The other pair is inside of the lips of the cloaca.

== Histology of the integument ==
The epidermis of an embryo, young, or half-grown Crocodilia contains the rete Malpighii: a single layer of short, cylindrical cells. Over the rete are somewhat flattened, disk-shaped cells formed by transverse division of the underlying rete cells. On the outside lies the epitrichial layer, a mosaic of polygonal cells each with an oval nucleus near its middle. Between the epitrichial cells are small oval holes, not unlike the stomata in the epidermis of plant tissues. Bronn thinks these are not artifacts, but he does not suggest any explanation of their occurrence.

On the short, cylindrical rete Malpighii cells are flattened cells that gradually become very flat and lose their nuclei as they pass over into the horny layer. The stratum corneum consists of strongly flattened cells in which the nuclei can no longer be clearly seen, though their location can usually be determined by the groups of pigment granules. On the cells of the more superficial layers of the stratum corneum are straight, dark lines, perhaps ridges caused by pressure of the over- or underlying polygonal cells. The individual cells of the horny layer are usually easily isolated in the belly and neck regions where they never become very thick; but in the back the cells in this layer are very numerous and fuse with each other to form the bony plates; here the rete is the only clearly differentiated layer. Whether prickle cells are present in the epidermis of the crocodile Bronn is not certain, though he thinks they probably are.

Rathke pointed out that on the surface of certain folds of the integument, especially in the region of the jaws, are found in all Crocodilia certain small, scattered, wart-like elevations, around each of which is customarily a narrow, shallow, circular groove; they usually have a dark brown but sometimes a gray or even white color. Microscopic examination shows these warts to be of epidermal origin, consisting of bright, round cells that are closely united, without visible intercellular substance. Treatment with potassium hydroxide and then with water will show sometimes, though not always, fine granular nuclei in the cells. In probably all members of the genus Crocodilus, at least is found, on the thick swelling on the right and on the left side of the neck and trunk, a small, flat pit which has the appearance of the opening of an integumental gland. The pits are present also in the scales of the throat, under the side of the neck, sides of the body, lateral and ventral surfaces of the anterior half of the tail, and the legs. They are near the hinder border of the scales. Only occasionally are two pits found in one scale. These pits are found in the gavials but are absent in some, probably all, alligators. A small knob projects from the center of some of the pits. These pits are not openings of glands but have about the same structure as the pits seen in the head.

The integumental bones in the Crocodilia originate in the connective tissue of the cutis. Investigations in young animals show that these bones usually take their origin in the under and middle layers of the cutis and generally work towards the periphery.

== Sources ==
- Bronn, H. G. Klassen und Ordnungen des Thier-Reichs, vol. 63, "Reptilien 2, Eidechsen und Wasserechsen". 1959.
- Gadow, H. Amphibia and reptiles. The Cambridge Natural History. MacMillan and Co. Ltd., London, 1923.
- Rathke, C. Untersuchen über die Entwickelung und den Körperbau der Crocodile. Braunschweig, 1866.
- Reese, Albert M. The Alligator and Its Allies (PDF). Originally published Knickerbocker Press, 1915; electronic reprint c2000 Arment Biological Press.
