= Covington, Columbus and Black Hills Railroad =

Railroad in Nebraska, USA

The Covington, Columbus and Black Hills Railroad is an historic narrow gauge railroad that operated in the U.S. state of Nebraska.

Possibly the only narrow gauge revenue railroad in Nebraska, it opened in 1876 and ran on 26 mi (42 km) of 3 ft 6 in (1,067 mm) narrow gauge track in the northeast part of the state from Covington (South Sioux City) to Ponca.

In 1879 it merged to become part of the Sioux City and Nebraska Railroad. It later merged into the Chicago, Saint Paul, Minneapolis and Omaha Railway which saw the line extended to Wynot.
