= Breslau, Nebraska =

Unincorporated community in Nebraska, United States

- Unincorporated Community
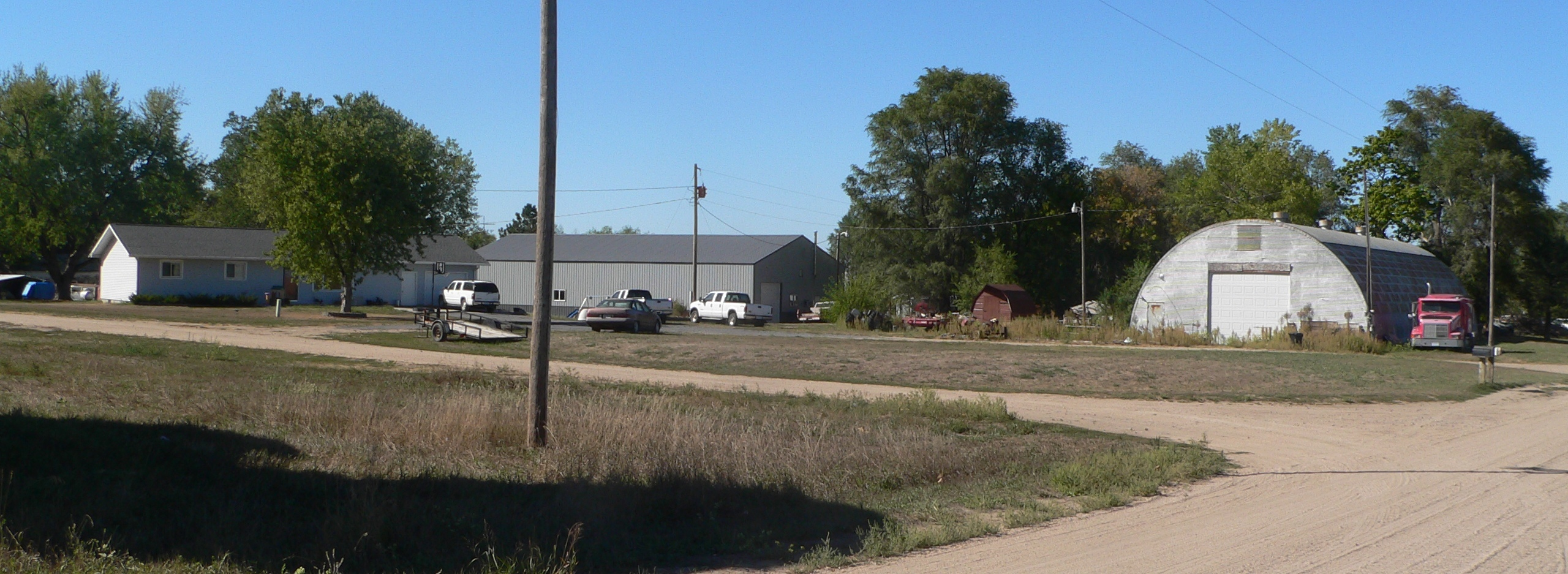

- Location within Nebraska Location within the United States
- Coordinates: 42.3503°N 97.6989°W
- Country: United States
- State: Nebraska
- County: Pierce

Breslau is an unincorporated community in Pierce County, Nebraska, United States. It is located on U.S. Route 20, approximately equidistant from Plainview and Osmond, at the corner of 541st Avenue.

== History ==
Breslau got its start following construction of the Chicago, Burlington and Quincy Railroad through the territory. Breslau was originally built up chiefly by Germans. It was named after Wrocław (known as Breslau in German), formerly in Prussia (in modern-day Poland).

A post office was established in Breslau in 1911, and remained in operation until being discontinued in 1935.
