= Pebble, Nebraska =

Coordinates: 41.698°N 96.732°W

Pebble is a ghost town in Dodge County, Nebraska, United States.

== History ==
Pebble was platted in 1870, but the town later fell into terminal decline when the railroad bypassed it.

== See also ==
- List of ghost towns in Nebraska
