= Lushton, Nebraska =

Village in York County, Nebraska, United States

- Village
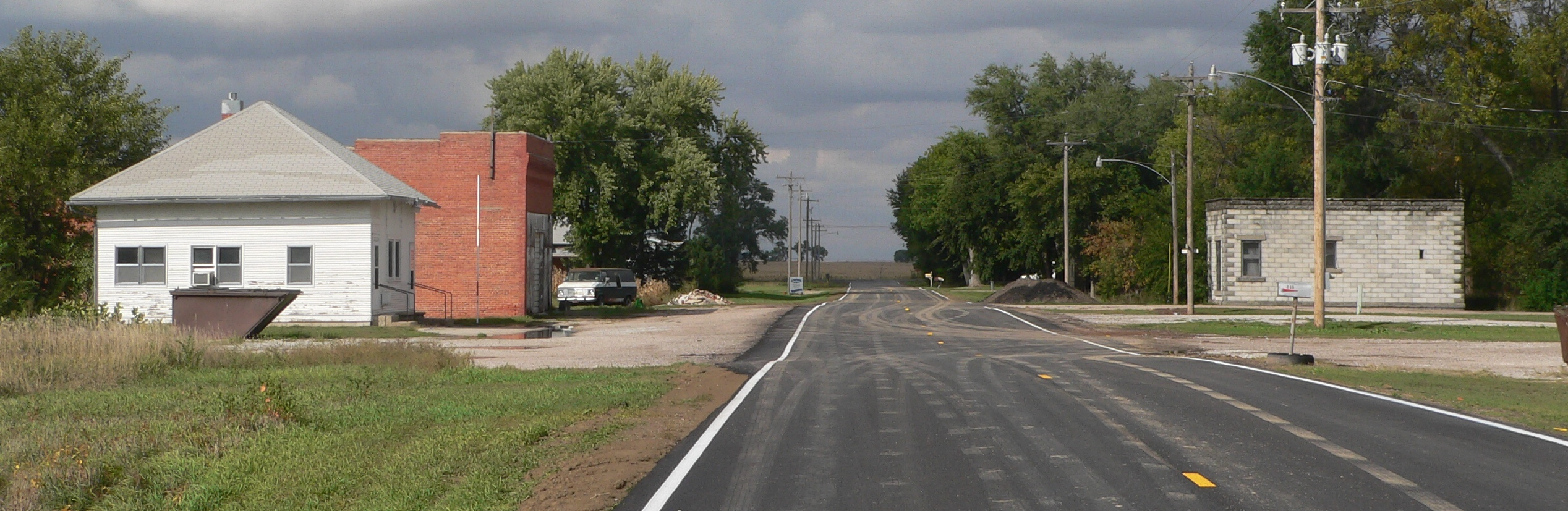
- Downtown Lushton: Gilbert Street, October 2013

- Location of Lushton, Nebraska
- Coordinates: 40°43′27″N 97°43′25″W
- Country: United States
- State: Nebraska
- County: York

Area
  - Total: 0.14 sq mi (0.37 km^{2})
  - Land: 0.14 sq mi (0.37 km^{2})
  - Water: 0 sq mi (0.00 km^{2})
- Elevation: 1,677 ft (511 m)

Population (2020)
  - Total: 28
  - Density: 196.6/sq mi (75.91/km^{2})
- Time zone: UTC-6 (Central (CST))
  - Summer (DST): UTC-5 (CDT)
- ZIP code: 68371
- Area code: 402
- FIPS code: 31-29645
- GNIS feature ID: 2399203

Lushton is a village in York County, Nebraska, United States. As of the 2020 census, Lushton had a population of 28.

== History ==
Lushton was laid out and platted in 1887 when the Kansas City & Omaha Railroad was extended to that point. It was named for a railroad official.

A post office was established in Lushton in 1887, and remained in operation until it was discontinued in 1965.

== Geography ==
According to the United States Census Bureau, the village has a total area of 0.14 square miles (0.36 km^{2}), all land.

== Demographics ==
Historical population
Census	Pop.	Note	%±
1910	205		—
1920	186		−9.3%
1930	148		−20.4%
1940	126		−14.9%
1950	60		−52.4%
1960	45		−25.0%
1970	34		−24.4%
1980	33		−2.9%
1990	28		−15.2%
2000	33		17.9%
2010	30		−9.1%
2020	28		−6.7%
U.S. Decennial Census

=== 2010 census ===
As of the census of 2010, there were 30 people, 15 households, and 10 families residing in the village. The population density was 214.3 inhabitants per square mile (82.7/km^{2}). There were 18 housing units at an average density of 128.6 per square mile (49.7/km^{2}). The racial makeup of the village was 100.0% White.

There were 15 households, of which 13.3% had children under the age of 18 living with them, 60.0% were married couples living together, 6.7% had a female householder with no husband present, and 33.3% were non-families. 33.3% of all households were made up of individuals, and 6.7% had someone living alone who was 65 years of age or older. The average household size was 2.00 and the average family size was 2.50.

The median age in the village was 51 years. 13.3% of residents were under the age of 18; 0.1% were between the ages of 18 and 24; 23.4% were from 25 to 44; 26.6% were from 45 to 64; and 36.7% were 65 years of age or older. The gender makeup of the village was 56.7% male and 43.3% female.

=== 2000 census ===
As of the census of 2000, there were 33 people, 16 households, and 12 families residing in the village. The population density was 232.9 inhabitants per square mile (89.9/km^{2}). There were 17 housing units at an average density of 120.0 per square mile (46.3/km^{2}). The racial makeup of the village was 100.00% White.

There were 16 households, out of which 6.3% had children under the age of 18 living with them, 62.5% were married couples living together, 6.3% had a female householder with no husband present, and 25.0% were non-families. 25.0% of all households were made up of individuals, and 6.3% had someone living alone who was 65 years of age or older. The average household size was 2.06 and the average family size was 2.42.

In the village, the population was spread out, with 12.1% under the age of 18, 21.2% from 25 to 44, 48.5% from 45 to 64, and 18.2% who were 65 years of age or older. The median age was 56 years. For every 100 females, there were 120.0 males. For every 100 females age 18 and over, there were 93.3 males.

As of 2000 the median income for a household in the village was $31,250, and the median income for a family was $43,750. Males had a median income of $22,500 versus $22,500 for females. The per capita income for the village was $17,726. None of the population and none of the families were below the poverty line.

== See also ==
- List of municipalities in Nebraska
