= Jamaica, Nebraska =

Community in Nebraska

Coordinates: 40.6988903°N 96.6897400°W

Jamaica is an unincorporated community in Lancaster County, Nebraska. The town site is located in the extreme southeast of Yankee Hill precinct.

== History ==
Jamaica was established in 1885, most likely named after Jamaica, New York. The town primarily functioned as a railroad stop on a Union Pacific Railroad line that continued into nearby Lincoln. The town grew to include business such as a blacksmith, creamery, and grain elevator as well as a Baptist church. The town was located entirely in the floodplain of the nearby Salt Creek on the west bank and was particularly susceptible to flooding as it was located on a stretch of the stream which included two severe bends. Saltillo, another now-abandoned town in Nebraska, was located on the eastern bank of Salt Creek and experienced similar problems. By the 1920s, Jamaica was mostly vacant as rail traffic on the Union Pacific line decreased and Lincoln grew toward the town.

The land Jamaica was previously situated on is now part of the Jamaica North Trail, named in honor of the town. The Jamaica North Trail is a public walking and biking trail which follows the path of the former Union Pacific rail line and is part of the Homestead Trail which connects downtown Lincoln, Nebraska to Marysville, Kansas.
