= Rock Bluff, Nebraska =

- Ghost town
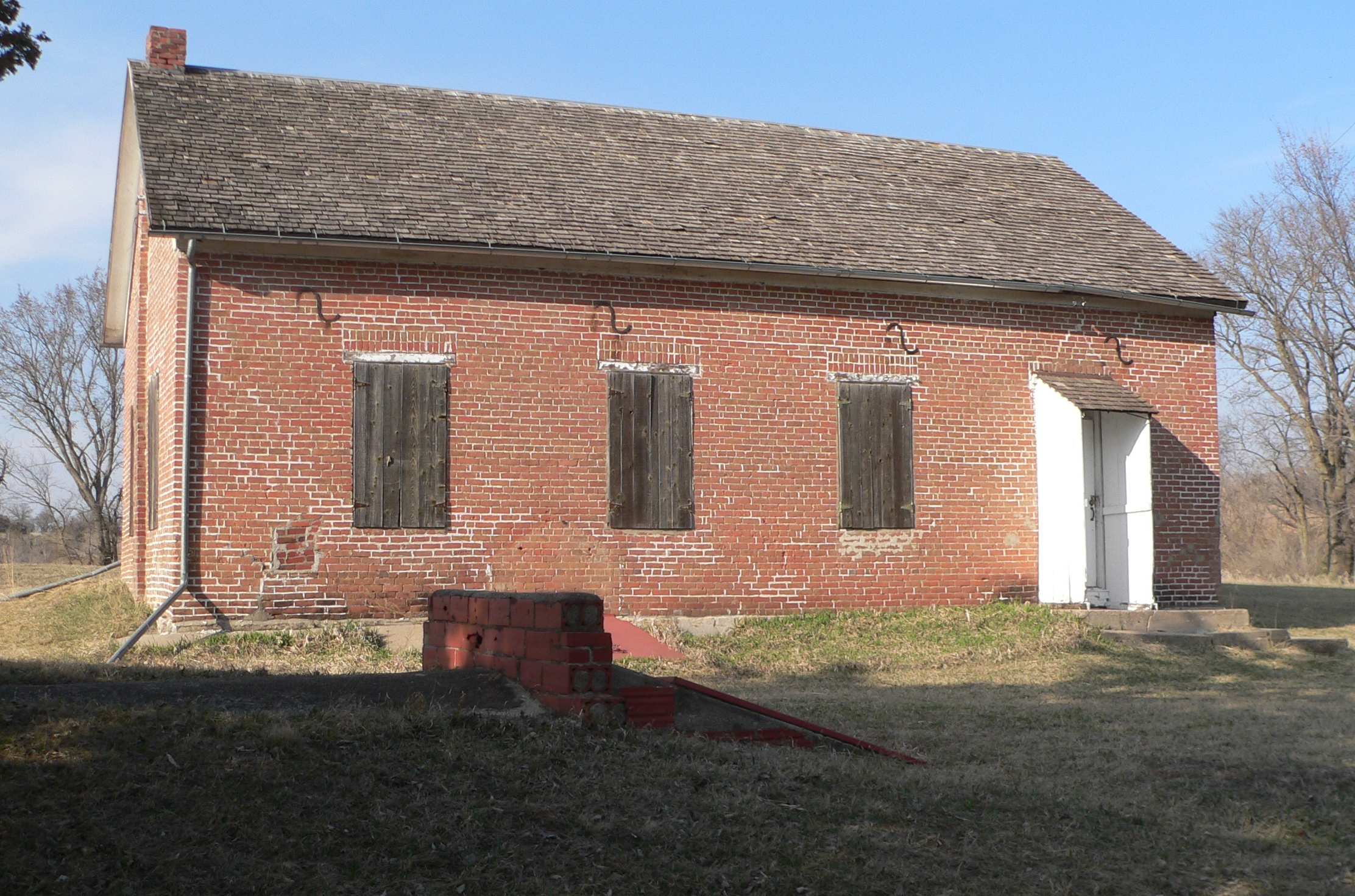
- Rock Bluff School, formerly the Naomi Institute

- Location within the state of Nebraska Rock Bluff (the United States)
- Coordinates: 40°55′45″N 95°51′10″W
- Country: United States
- State: Nebraska
- County: Cass
- Time zone: UTC-6 (Central (CST))
  - Summer (DST): UTC-5 (CDT)

Rock Bluff is a ghost town in Cass County located approximately three miles east of Murray in the U.S. state of Nebraska. Once the home of an influential college called the Naomi Institute, Rock Bluff was instrumental in the 1866 vote that gave Nebraska statehood.

== History ==
Rock Bluff was a pioneer crossing on the Missouri River. Settled in 1854 by a German named Benedict Spires, Rock Bluffs became a leading point for equipping freighting outfits to cross the plains during the 1850s. By 1877 it had almost 200 residents, as well as a Methodist Church, a post office, a mayor, the county fair, a common lodge hall for Masons and Odd Fellows, and a variety of businesses including three stores, two blacksmith shops, two saloons and a billiard hall. There was a race track near the steamboat landing, and a coal mine south of town. Rock Bluff once competed with Plattsmouth to be the county seat of Cass County.

=== 1866 Nebraska Statehood vote ===
In 1866, the composition of the Territorial Legislature in Nebraska was very important because the Legislators were to choose Nebraska's two state senators. That year, before the Legislature was a unicameral, the state House was to include 17 Republicans and 17 Democrats, and the state Senate was six to five for the Democrats, with Cass County's votes still to be counted.

107 votes were cast for Democrats that year, with 47 for the Republicans. However, there were charges of voter fraud which led the state clerk to throw out the county's votes and put the county in the office of the county clerk, who was Republican. That party was against slavery existing in the new state, and when the Legislature went Republican the Territory was allowed into the Union.

=== Abandonment ===
After a railroad bridge was built in Omaha in the 1870s the town of Rock Bluff lost its importance, which was only exacerbated when the closest railroad tracks were built ten miles west. The post office was closed in 1904, and the town was completely abandoned by the 1940s.

== Naomi Institute ==
Rock Bluff was home to Professor J.D. Patterson's Naomi Institute, which he founded there in 1870. It was regarded as one of the leading educational institutions in Nebraska, and was the first higher education institution in Cass County. It closed in 1872, after failing to gain support, and the building later became Rock Bluff School.

== Notable person ==
Perry Ivan "Ivia" Graves was born, raised and died in Rock Bluff. He was the 1912 Boxing Welterweight Champion of the World, and traveled across the United States and around the world earning and defending the title. His career lasted 15 years, from 1910 to 1925.

== See also ==
- History of Nebraska
