= Glencoe, Nebraska =

Ghost town in Dodge County, Nebraska

Coordinates: 41.65417°N 96.84892°W

Glencoe is a ghost town in Dodge County, Nebraska, United States.

== History ==
A post office was established at Glencoe in 1871, and remained in operation until it was discontinued in 1896. The town was named for James Glenn, a pioneer settler who served as postmaster.

== See also ==
- List of ghost towns in Nebraska
