= Houston, Nebraska =

Ghost town in Nebraska, U.S.

Coordinates: 40°54′57″N 97°32′24″W

Houston is a ghost town in York County, Nebraska, United States.

== History ==
Houston was platted in 1887. It was named for Joseph D. Houston, a pioneer settler. A post office was established at Houston in 1887, and remained in operation until it was discontinued in 1928.
