= Spring Ranch, Nebraska =

Coordinates: 40.40640°N 98.23394°W

Spring Ranch is a ghost town in Clay County, Nebraska, in the United States.

== History ==
A post office was established at Spring Ranch (also spelled historically Springranch) in 1870, and remained in operation until it was discontinued 1943.

== See also ==
- List of ghost towns in Nebraska
