= Spiker, Nebraska =

Unincorporated community in Nebraska, U.S.

- Ghost town
- Location within Nebraska Location within the United States
- Coordinates: 41°36′26″N 96°18′35″W
- Country: United States
- State: Nebraska
- County: Washington
- Elevation: 761 ft (232 m)
- Time zone: UTC-6 (Central (CST))
  - Summer (DST): UTC-5 (CDT)

Spiker is an unincorporated community in Washington County, Nebraska.

== History ==
The Spiker General Store was established in 1890, and the community was created around the same year. A post office was opened that year as well, but closed in 1902.

The town was named after Samuel Spiker, an early resident and settler.

In the late 1930s, the community was damaged by a fire. It was abandoned soon after.
