= Covington, Nebraska =

- Ghost Town
- Location within Nebraska
- Coordinates: 42.49°N 96.41°W
- Country: United States
- State: Nebraska
- County: Dakota

Covington is a ghost town in Dakota County, Nebraska, United States. It is now incorporated into South Sioux City, Nebraska.

== History ==
A post office was established at Covington in 1858, and remained in operation until it was discontinued in 1893. It took its name from the Covington, Columbus and Black Hills Railroad.

It was known during its time as one of the "wickedest" places on the planet. It was known for its brothels, saloons and gambling dens. A special election in 1893 approved the merger of Covington and Stanton into the city of South Sioux City.
