= Bower, Nebraska =

- Ghost Town
- Location within Nebraska
- Coordinates: 40.3°N 97.2°W
- Country: United States
- State: Nebraska
- County: Jefferson

Bower is a ghost town in Jefferson County, Nebraska, United States.

== History ==
A post office was established as Bowerville in 1870, renamed Bower in 1872, and remained in operation until it was discontinued in 1901. The community was named for the Bower family of pioneer settlers.
