= Dale, Nebraska =

- Ghost Town
- Location within Nebraska Location within the United States
- Coordinates: 41.52°N 99.83°W
- Country: United States
- State: Nebraska
- County: Custer

Dale is a ghost town in Custer County, Nebraska, United States.

== History ==
A post office was established at Dale in 1883, and remained in operation until 1894. The community was named for Samuel Dale, a pioneer.
