= Montrose, Nebraska =

Former village in Nebraska, U.S.

Coordinates: 42°55′21″N 103°43′44″W

Montrose is a former village in Sioux County, Nebraska, United States. The townsite is located near the intersection of the Powder River Trail and the Cheyenne & Black Hills Stage Road and is now a part of the Oglala National Grassland. All that remains of the town is the historic Immaculate Conception Catholic Church, built there in 1887.

== History ==
During the Battle of Warbonnet Creek on July 17, 1876, Buffalo Bill Cody shot, killed, and scalped a Cheyenne warrior near the townsite-to-be, which he later often celebrated during his Wild West shows in a reenactment he entitled "The Red Right Hand, or, Buffalo Bill's First Scalp for Custer".

Montrose was established in 1887 on a ford across Hat Creek by immigrants from Austria, Germany, and Luxembourg. It was named from its lofty elevation (mont) and native rose bushes (rose). That year, the settlers built Immaculate Conception Catholic Church. In 1890, fear of the Ghost Dance cult led the settlers to construct a fortified bunker. Omaha Bishop Richard Scannell confirmed 46 Catholics at the church in June 1899. By 1904, the settlement had a school, a blacksmith, and a general store. In 1910, the settlement's population peaked at 24 inhabitants.

Montrose had a post office from 1887 to 1948. In 1953, the schoolhouse was moved away from the townsite.

== See also ==
- List of ghost towns in Nebraska
