= Abdal, Nebraska =

Coordinates: 40.12223°N 98.12338°W

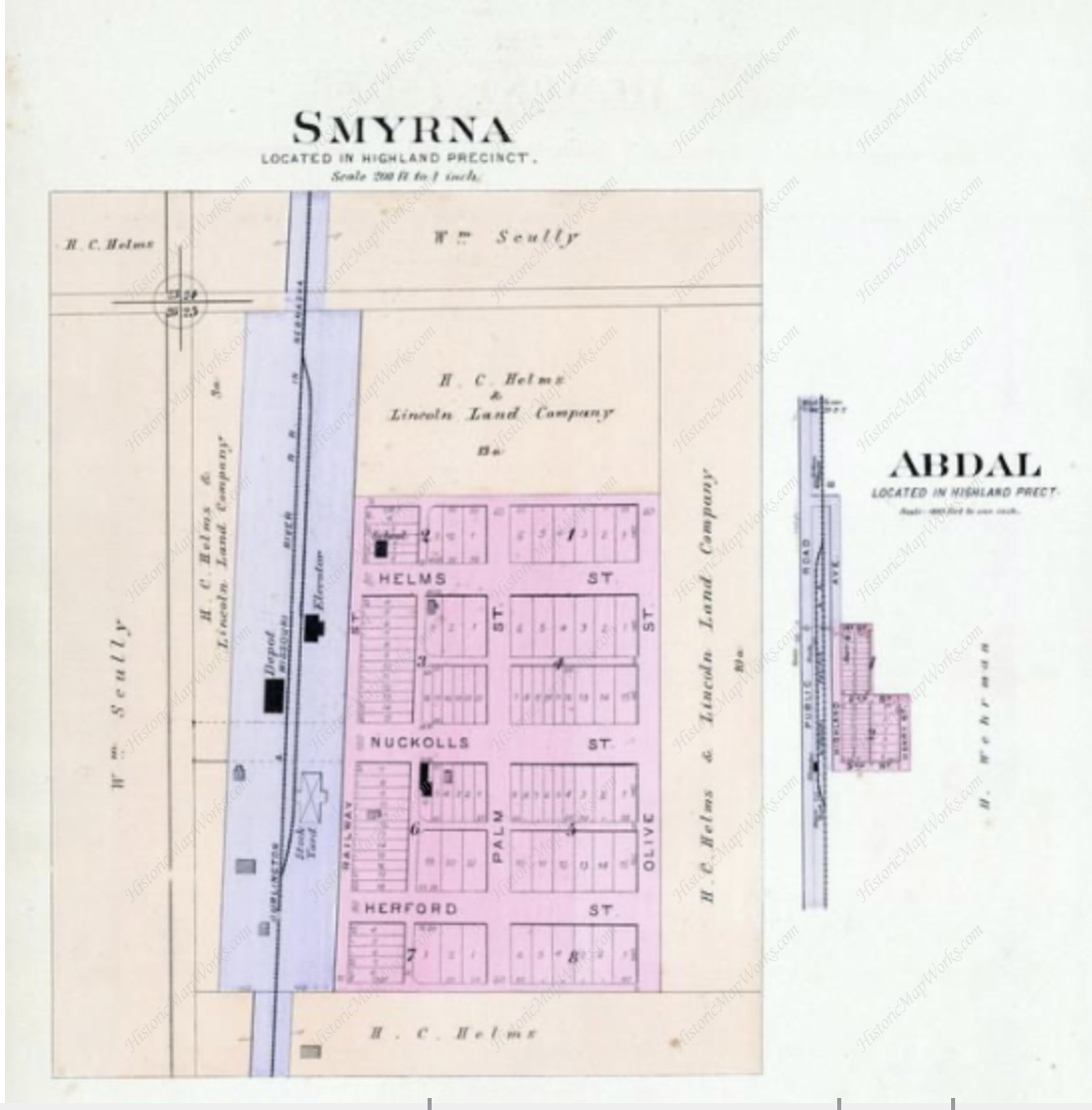
Smyrna and Abdal, Nebraska in the year 1900

Abdal is an extinct town in Nuckolls County, in the U.S. state of Nebraska.

A post office was established at Abdal in 1893, and remained in operation until 1902. The name Abdal is derived from Arabic.

== History ==
A post office was established at Abdal on July 19, 1893, and discontinued on April 1, 1902. The community was located on the Missouri Pacific Railroad.

== See also ==
- List of ghost towns in Nebraska
