= Elton, Nebraska =

- Ghost Town
- Location within Nebraska Location within the United States
- Coordinates: 41.5°N 99.47°W
- Country: United States
- State: Nebraska
- County: Custer

Elton is a ghost town in Custer County, Nebraska, United States.

== History ==
A post office was established at Elton in 1879, and remained in operation until it was discontinued in 1916. It was named after Elton, New York.
