= Factoryville, Nebraska =

- Ghost town
- Location within the state of Nebraska Factoryville (the United States)
- Coordinates: 40°48′N 95°58′W
- Country: United States
- State: Nebraska
- County: Cass

Population (2000)
  - Total: 0
- Time zone: UTC-6 (Central (CST))
  - Summer (DST): UTC-5 (CDT)
- Area code: 402
- GNIS feature ID: 1897821

Factoryville is a ghost town in Cass County, Nebraska, United States. Located approximately halfway between Union and Nehawka, the town straddled the Lincoln-Union Highway and neighbored a smaller village called Mount Pleasant. It once featured a flour mill, stores, hotels, a post office, and a Methodist college called Factoryville College. Founded in the late 1850s, in 1873 its name was changed to Union Mills, and in 1880 it was changed back to Factoryville. The post office was established in the late 1860s when a local named Isaac Pollard was traveling to the Eastern United States. Along the way he stopped in Washington, D.C., where he selected the name Factoryville, along with the name Nehawka for a neighboring town.

The construction of the railroad on the opposite side of Weeping Water Creek from Factoryville led to the demise of the town, and by the 1890s there were only empty buildings.
