= Pittsburg, Nebraska =

Pittsburg is a ghost town in Seward County, Nebraska, United States.

== History ==
Pittsburg was founded in 1873 at a location once thought to be rich in valuable peat, but the town was soon abandoned. The founder might have intended the name to be Peatsburg. A post office spelled Pittsburgh operated between 1873 and 1875.

== See also ==
- List of ghost towns in Nebraska
