= Murray, Nebraska =

- Village
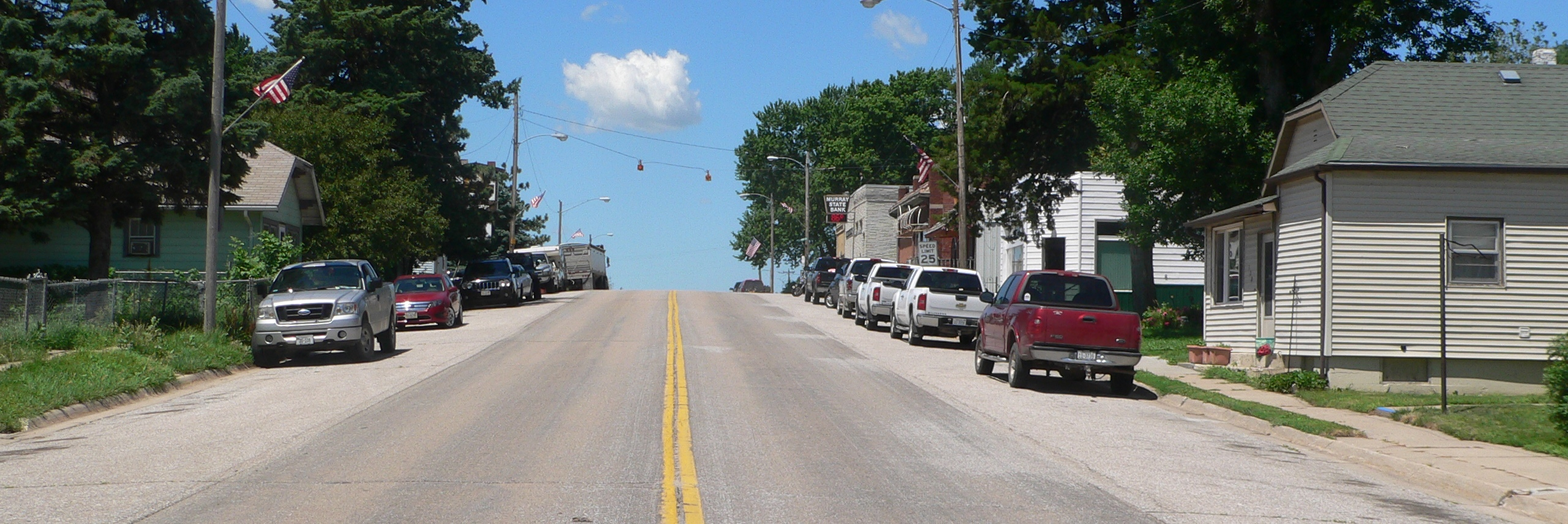
- Nebraska Highway 1 in downtown Murray

- Location of Murray, Nebraska
- Coordinates: 40°54′59″N 95°55′36″W
- Country: United States
- State: Nebraska
- County: Cass
- Platted: 1891
- Incorporated: 1935

Area
  - Total: 0.37 sq mi (0.97 km^{2})
  - Land: 0.37 sq mi (0.97 km^{2})
  - Water: 0 sq mi (0.00 km^{2})
- Elevation: 1,155 ft (352 m)

Population (2020)
  - Total: 480
  - Density: 1,284.3/sq mi (495.86/km^{2})
- Time zone: UTC-6 (Central (CST))
  - Summer (DST): UTC-5 (CDT)
- ZIP code: 68409
- Area code: 402
- FIPS code: 31-33425
- GNIS feature ID: 2399430
- Website: http://www.MurrayNebraska.com

Murray is a village in Cass County, Nebraska, United States. The population was 480 at the 2020 census.

== History ==
Settlement in the area began in the 1870s, a few miles west of Rock Bluffs, then a steamboat landing on the Missouri River. In 1878 the Presbyterian congregation at Rock Bluffs hauled its church building by wagon to a crossroads several miles inland, placing it, along with a schoolhouse, on land donated by James Walker. An early variant name for the resulting settlement was "Fairview".

A post office was established on September 22, 1884, in the blacksmith shop of William Loughridge. The name "Fairview" was set aside because it was easily confused with other Nebraska towns, and the settlement was named instead for Rev. George Reed Murray, the first resident pastor of the church. Lillian Fitzpatrick's Nebraska Place-Names likewise gives the source of the name as Rev. George Murray, a pioneer settler.

Murray was platted in 1891, when Walker and Samuel Latta engaged D. M. Lewis to survey the townsite and file a plat. Later the same year the Missouri Pacific Railroad was extended to the point, linking Murray with Union, Plattsmouth and Omaha.

A fire on June 9, 1927, destroyed about half of the village's businesses, among them the hardware store, the meat market, the community hall and the post office. Murray incorporated in 1935, and a volunteer fire department was organized soon afterward. A rural fire district was formed in 1962, and the village joined it in 1981.

== Geography ==
Murray lies on Nebraska Highway 1 in eastern Cass County, about 25 miles (40 km) south of Omaha. According to the United States Census Bureau, the village has a total area of 0.37 square miles (0.96 km^{2}), all land.

== Demographics ==
Historical population
Census	Pop.	Note	%±
1940	209		—
1950	244		16.7%
1960	279		14.3%
1970	286		2.5%
1980	465		62.6%
1990	418		−10.1%
2000	481		15.1%
2010	463		−3.7%
2020	480		3.7%
U.S. Decennial Census

=== 2020 census ===
As of the 2020 census, there were 480 people, 186 households and 200 housing units in the village. The racial makeup of the village was 93.8% White, 0.4% Native American, 0.4% Asian, 0.2% from some other race, and 5.2% from two or more races. Hispanic or Latino residents of any race were 2.9% of the population.

Of the 186 households, 60.8% were married-couple households and 5.9% were cohabiting-couple households; 17.2% had a male householder with no spouse or partner present and 16.1% had a female householder with no spouse or partner present. Someone under the age of 18 lived in 34.4% of households, and someone aged 65 or older lived in 37.1% of them. Of the 200 housing units, 186 (93.0%) were occupied.

The median age in the village was 36.1 years; 28.5% of residents were under the age of 18 and 17.3% were 65 years of age or older.

=== 2010 census ===
As of the census of 2010, there were 463 people, 187 households, and 130 families living in the village. The population density was 1,251.4 inhabitants per square mile (483.2/km^{2}). There were 210 housing units at an average density of 567.6 per square mile (219.2/km^{2}). The racial makeup of the village was 94.4% White, 0.2% African American, 0.4% Native American, 0.2% Asian, 1.3% from other races, and 3.5% from two or more races. Hispanic or Latino of any race were 4.1% of the population.

There were 187 households, of which 32.6% had children under the age of 18 living with them, 52.4% were married couples living together, 12.3% had a female householder with no husband present, 4.8% had a male householder with no wife present, and 30.5% were non-families. 26.2% of all households were made up of individuals, and 12.8% had someone living alone who was 65 years of age or older. The average household size was 2.48 and the average family size was 2.98.

The median age in the village was 41.4 years. 24.4% of residents were under the age of 18; 7.1% were between the ages of 18 and 24; 22.2% were from 25 to 44; 28.2% were from 45 to 64; and 17.9% were 65 years of age or older. The gender makeup of the village was 50.1% male and 49.9% female.

=== 2000 census ===
As of the census of 2000, there were 481 people, 188 households, and 140 families living in the village. The population density was 2,067.1 inhabitants per square mile (798.1/km^{2}). There were 197 housing units at an average density of 846.6 per square mile (326.9/km^{2}). The racial makeup of the village was 97.71% White, 1.25% Asian, 0.62% from other races, and 0.42% from two or more races. Hispanic or Latino of any race were 1.66% of the population.

There were 188 households, out of which 31.4% had children under the age of 18 living with them, 66.0% were married couples living together, 6.4% had a female householder with no husband present, and 25.5% were non-families. 21.8% of all households were made up of individuals, and 10.1% had someone living alone who was 65 years of age or older. The average household size was 2.56 and the average family size was 2.98.

In the village, the population was spread out, with 25.8% under the age of 18, 5.8% from 18 to 24, 29.5% from 25 to 44, 26.0% from 45 to 64, and 12.9% who were 65 years of age or older. The median age was 38 years. For every 100 females, there were 97.1 males. For every 100 females age 18 and over, there were 93.0 males.

As of 2000 the median income for a household in the village was $52,386, and the median income for a family was $56,250. Males had a median income of $37,386 versus $21,094 for females. The per capita income for the village was $21,274. About 2.1% of families and 2.6% of the population were below the poverty line, including 3.0% of those under age 18 and 7.5% of those age 65 or over.

== Education ==
Murray is served by Conestoga Public Schools, whose district office and junior–senior high school are located in the village.

School District 56, which served the Murray area, was organized in 1872. A high school built in 1914 was destroyed by fire on Christmas Eve 1932 and replaced by a brick building the following year. Committees formed in 1972 to reorganize the area's schools led to the construction of Conestoga Junior–Senior High School about 2 miles (3.2 km) west of Murray, which was dedicated in 1980.

== Parks and recreation ==
The village has two parks: Dr. Tyson Park, north of Main Street, and Young Memorial Park, on the northwest edge of the village.

== See also ==
- Naomi Institute
