= Meridian, Nebraska =

Coordinates: 40.21667°N 97.36421°W

Meridian is a ghost town in Jefferson County, Nebraska, United States.

== History ==
An early variant name was Big Sandy. A post office called Big Sandy was established in 1865, renamed Meridian in 1870 and remained in operation until it was discontinued in 1883. Meridian was named from its location on the sixth principal meridian.

The name is still used for Meridian Public Schools in the same county.

== See also ==
- List of ghost towns in Nebraska
