= Charlestown, Nebraska =

Charleston, Nebraska
- Ghost Town
- Location within Nebraska
- Coordinates: 40.82°N 97.69°W
- Country: United States
- State: Nebraska
- County: York
- Founded: 1887

Charleston is a ghost town in York County, Nebraska, United States.

== History ==
Charleston (also spelled Charlestown) was platted in 1887. Charles A. McCloud, for whom the community was named, was instrumental in bringing in the railroad to the area.

A post office was established in Charleston in 1888, and remained in operation until it was discontinued in 1941.
