= Mars, Nebraska =

- Ghost town
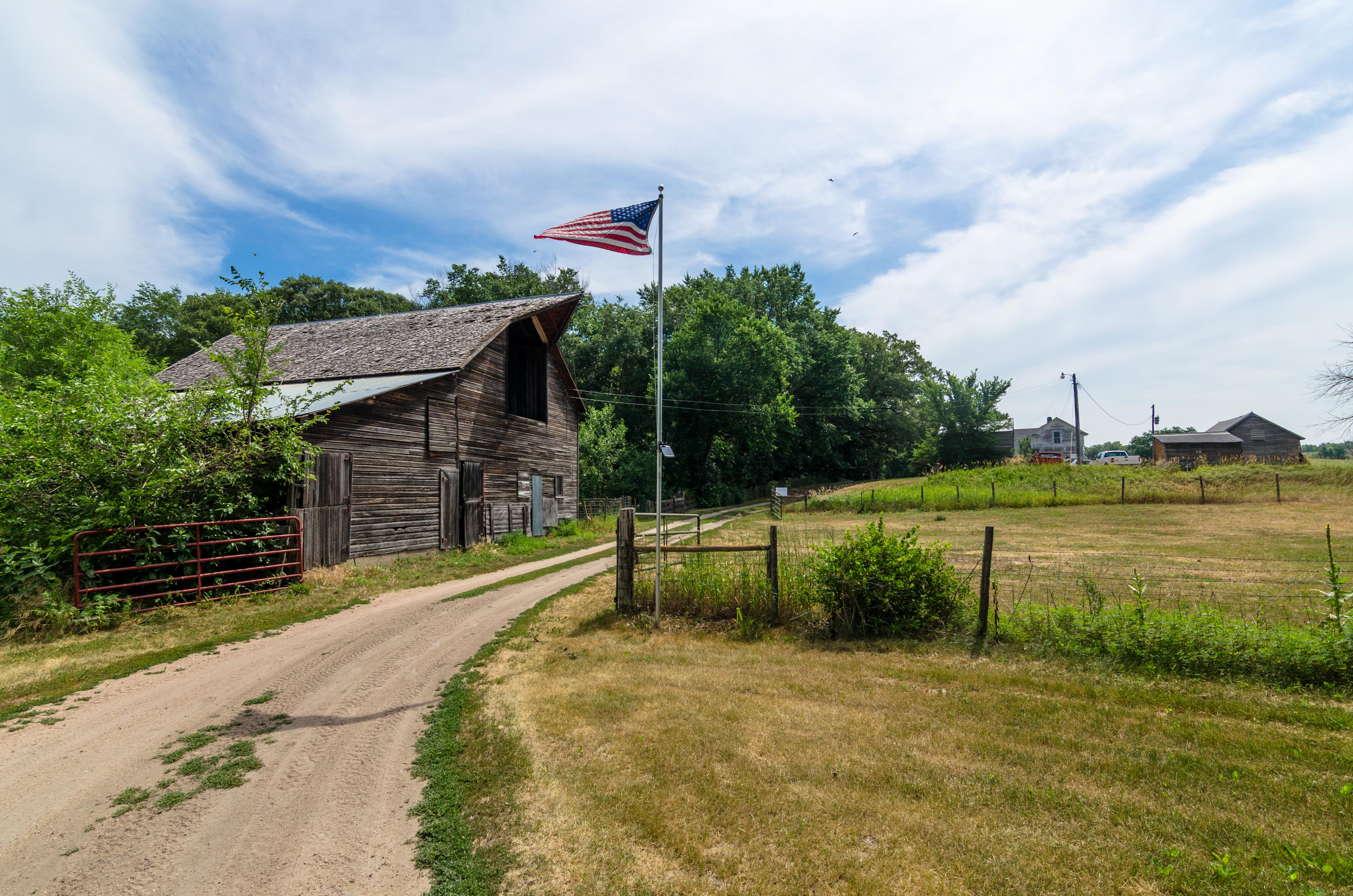
- Former Buildings in Mars

- Location within the state of Nebraska
- Coordinates: 42°25′47″N 98°08′03″W
- Country: United States
- State: Nebraska
- County: Knox
- Founded: 1886
- Time zone: UTC-6 (Central (CST))
  - Summer (DST): UTC-5 (CDT)
- ZIP code: 68773

Mars is a ghost town in Knox County, Nebraska. The site is now the location of a private campsite named the Historic Mars Campground.

== History ==
The town of Jessup, Nebraska was established in 1879 in anticipation of becoming a stop on a railroad line. When no railroad came through, Jessup went into decline and lost its post office. To regain mail service, residents proposed a new post office 100 yards north, across the county line in Knox County. In 1886 the new settlement was named Mars to complement the nearby town of Venus, Nebraska.

The town's population never exceeded 100 people. Mars had lost its general store by 1897, and the post office closed in 1910. The school became Mars' longest surviving establishment; classes were held in The Mars School until 1960.

Today the granary has been restored and an archaeological dig is being conducted on the homesite of Samuel Haskin, the town's founder.
