= Ragnhild Keyser =

Norwegian artist (1889–1943)

- Born: 12 December 1889
- Died: 12 October 1943 (aged 53)

Ragnhild Keyser (12 December 1889 – 12 October 1943) was a Norwegian painter. She was a visual artist and abstract painter principally active during the 1920s.

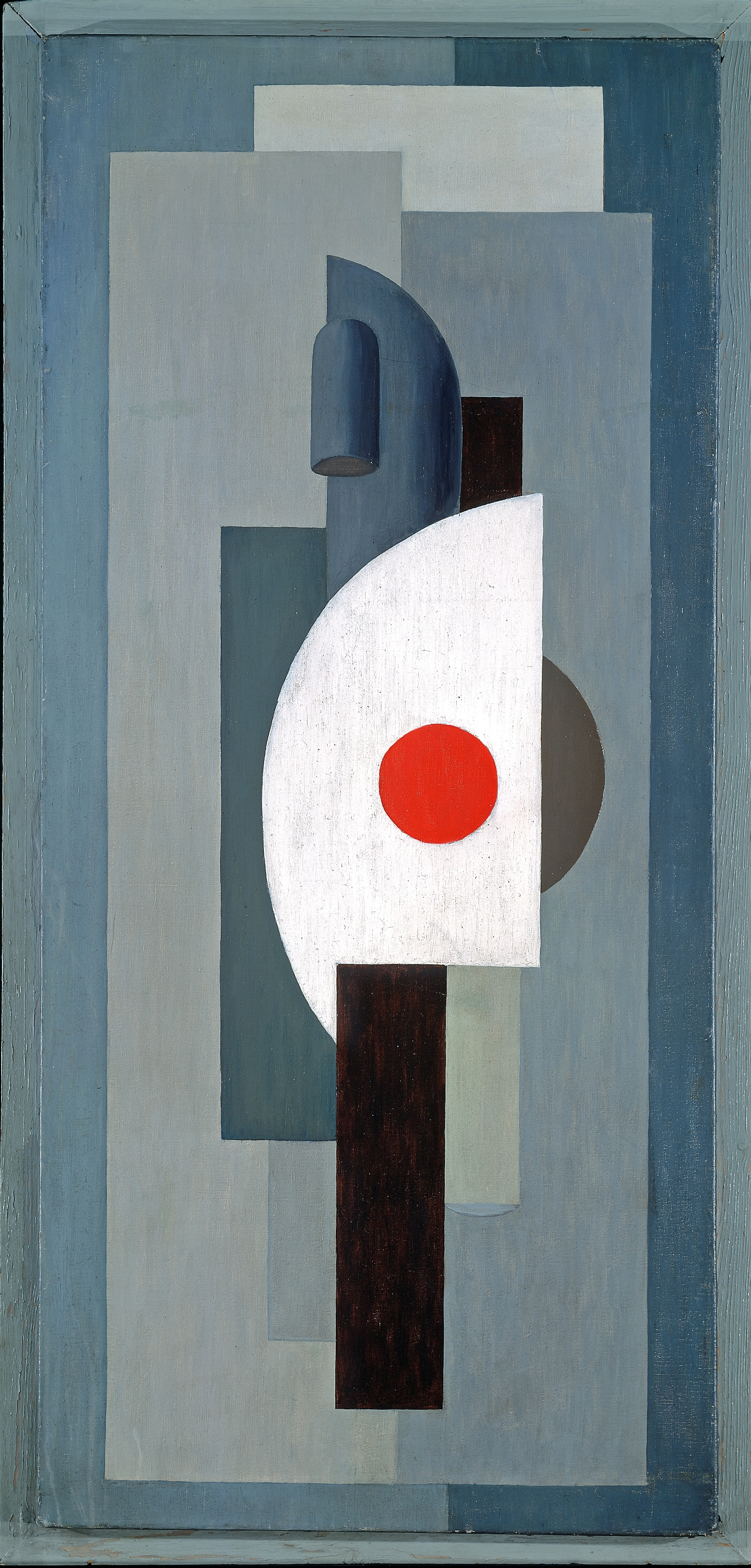
Armour, 1926

== Biography ==
Keyser was born in Oslo, Norway. She was the daughter of Ove Ludvig Keyser (1830-1889) and Karen Helga Ingebretsen (1849-1942). She first studied under Harriet Backer (1909–10) and with Pola Gauguin (1916–19).

She moved to Paris in 1920 and performed her most important works there during the years 1925–1927. She was a student of Roger Bissière and André Lhote at Académie Ranson in the early 1920s, Pedro Araujo at Académie Araujo (1922–23) and Fernand Léger at Académie Moderne (1924–26). She became inspired by Cubism and was most influenced by André Lhote and Fernand Léger.

Keyser participated in several exhibitions in the 1920s, including Salon des Indépendants (1923 and 1926), L'Art d'Aujourd'hui (1925) and Académie Moderne's exhibitions in Paris in 1926 and 1927. She also exhibited at the International Exhibition of Modern Art at the Brooklyn Museum in New York City (1926–27). She exhibited at Blomqvist's Kunsthandel in Oslo during 1932 and studied with Georg Jacobsen (1935–36).

Her painting Armour is in the collection of the National Museum of Art, Architecture and Design in Oslo.
