= Minersville, Nebraska =

Extinct hamlet in southeast Nebraska, U.S.

Coordinates: 40°35′49″N 95°47′21″W

Minersville is a former railroad town in Otoe County, Nebraska, United States. It was located approximately 5 miles (8 km) to the south-southwest of Nebraska City and 2 miles (3 km) east of the Nebraska City Municipal Airport. It was founded in the 1850s and dissolved by the early 1900s. The town was on the Missouri River until the Army Corps of Engineers redirected the river 1.5 miles (2.4 km) to the east.

== History ==
It is believed that the area had first been inhabited by a Native American tribe. The village was incorporated on May 4, 1857. A couple years later James Carmichael bought the town and renamed it "Otoe City". In the early 1860s a small coal deposit was found near the village. In 1864, the town was renamed "Minersville", despite the meager quantity and quality of the mine. By this time, Minersville contained a general store, post office, saloon, blacksmith shop, and a Congregational church. In 1874 the Midland Pacific Railway built a line through the town. Later the Burlington and Missouri River Railroad and Chicago, Burlington and Quincy Railroads operated the track.

The Minersville post office was discontinued in 1923.

== See also ==
- List of ghost towns in Nebraska
