= Naomi Institute =

- U.S. National Register of Historic Places
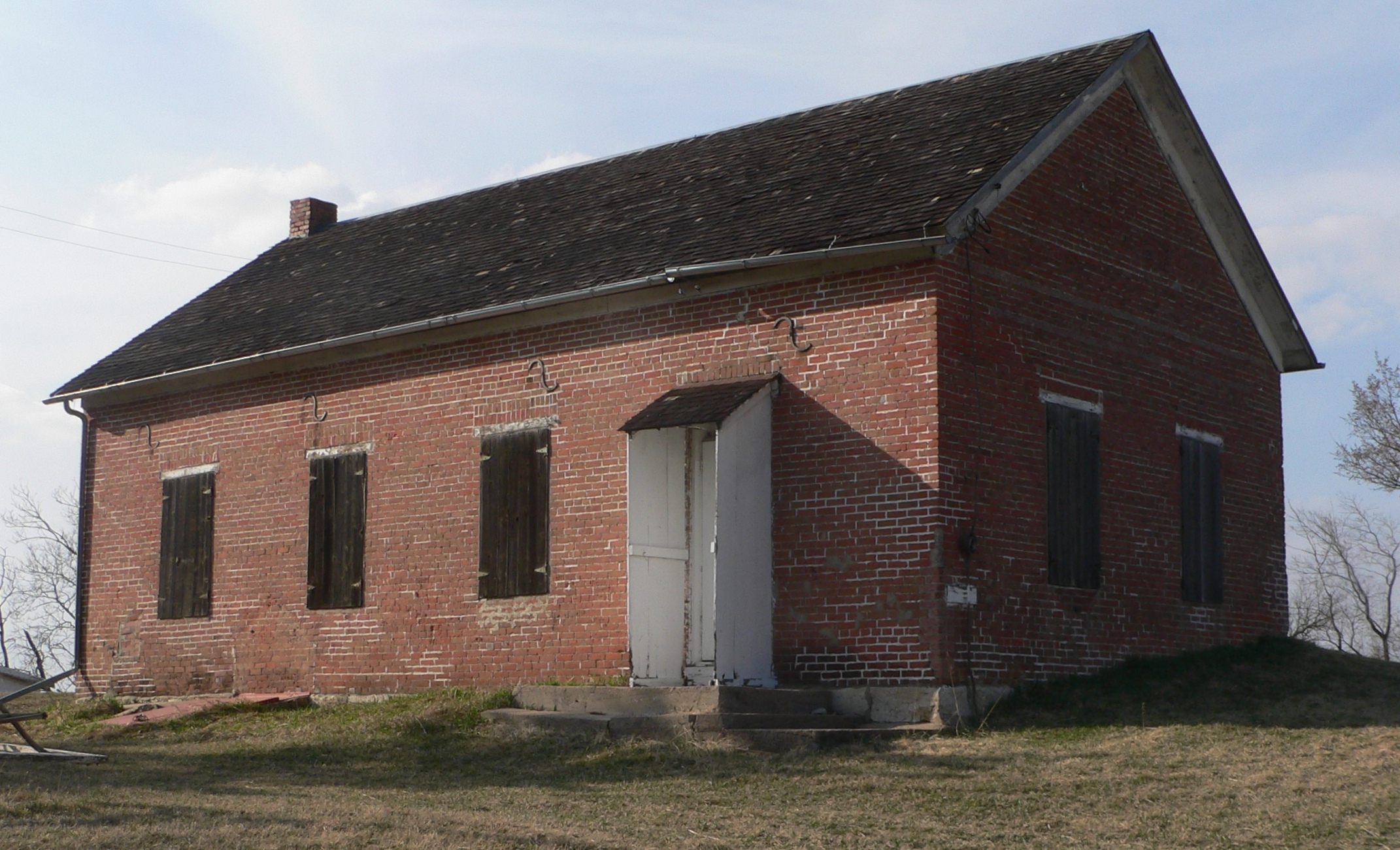
- Rock Bluff School, seen from the southeast.

- Location within Nebraska Location within the United States
- Location: Rock Bluff, Cass County, Nebraska
- Coordinates: 40°55′45.6″N 95°51′10.4″W
- Built: 1870
- NRHP reference No.: 77000825
- Added to NRHP: 1977

The Naomi Institute, also known as the Rock Bluff School, is located in the ghost town of Rock Bluff, Nebraska, three miles east of Murray. It was one of the earliest higher education institutions in Nebraska, founded in 1870 as a pioneer college. The building was listed on the National Register of Historic Places in 1977.

== History ==
Originally a two-story structure in Rock Bluff, Nebraska, today the one-story brick school is all that remains of a ghost town. Rock Bluff was a popular crossing on the Missouri River, and had a post office, a mayor, the county fair, a common lodge hall for Masons and Odd Fellows, and a variety of businesses including three stores, two blacksmith shops, two saloons and a billiard hall. There was a race track near the steamboat landing, and a coal mine south of town.

Joseph Diven Patterson secured a lot overlooking the Rock and Squaw creeks of the Missouri River bluffs in order to establish a school in 1870. He built a two-story building that was 25 feet by 50 feet in size for $3,500. On September 1, 1870 the Naomi Institute opened. Advertisements for the Institute reported that "the morals of the place are the very best there is, not a dramshop in the village, and the pupil will be free from the surroundings of vice that are usually found in larger and 'faster' towns in the West." The Naomi Institute was regarded as one of the leading educational institutions in Nebraska, and was the first higher education institution in Cass County.

After opening successfully, the school's debt forced Patterson to sell the building in 1872. It later served as the Rock Bluffs School.

After a railroad bridge was built in Omaha in the 1870s the town of Rock Bluff lost its importance, which was only exacerbated when the closest railroad tracks were built ten miles west. The town was completely abandoned by the 1940s.

== Present ==
Today the Rock Bluff School, purportedly the oldest schoolhouse in Cass County, is owned by the Cass County Historical Society and is used as a museum that is open by appointment. In 2003 the Nebraska Humanities Council held some of the events for the Plattsmouth Chautauqua on the site.

== See also ==
- History of Nebraska
