= Wee Town, Nebraska =

Unincorporated community in Nebraska, U.S.

Coordinates: 42°12′24″N 97°25′34″W

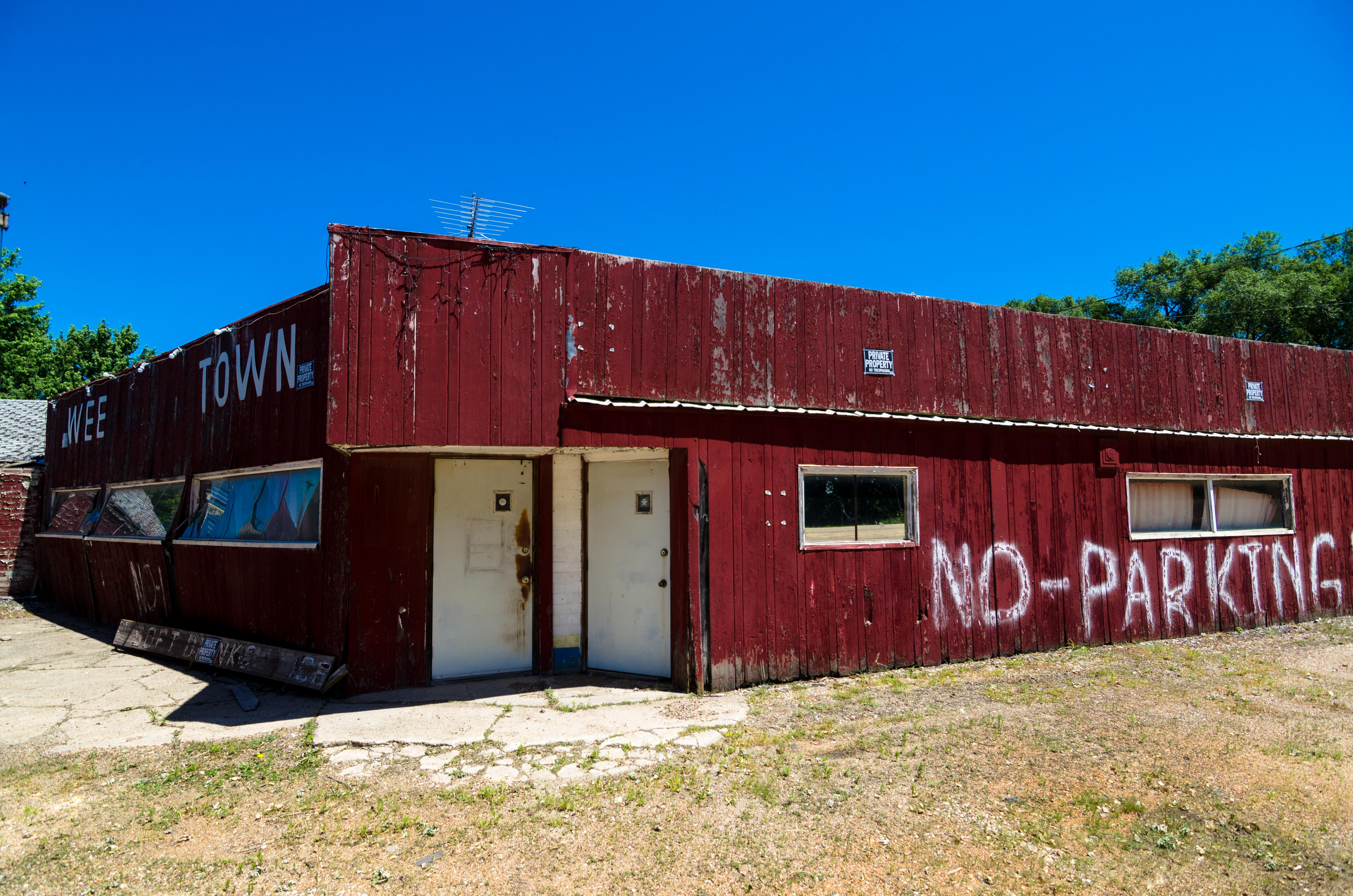
Abandoned gas station

Wee Town is an unincorporated community in Pierce County, Nebraska, United States. From the 1940s to the 1970s, Wee Town was a stopping point along Route 81, but the population never exceeded 50 individuals. A service station, a tavern, and a cafe were the most important employers. Wee Town lost its main source of income after new interstates were built in the late 1970s, which displaced Route 81 as the main throughways in the region.
