= Armour (Keyser) =

Painting by Ragnhild Keyser

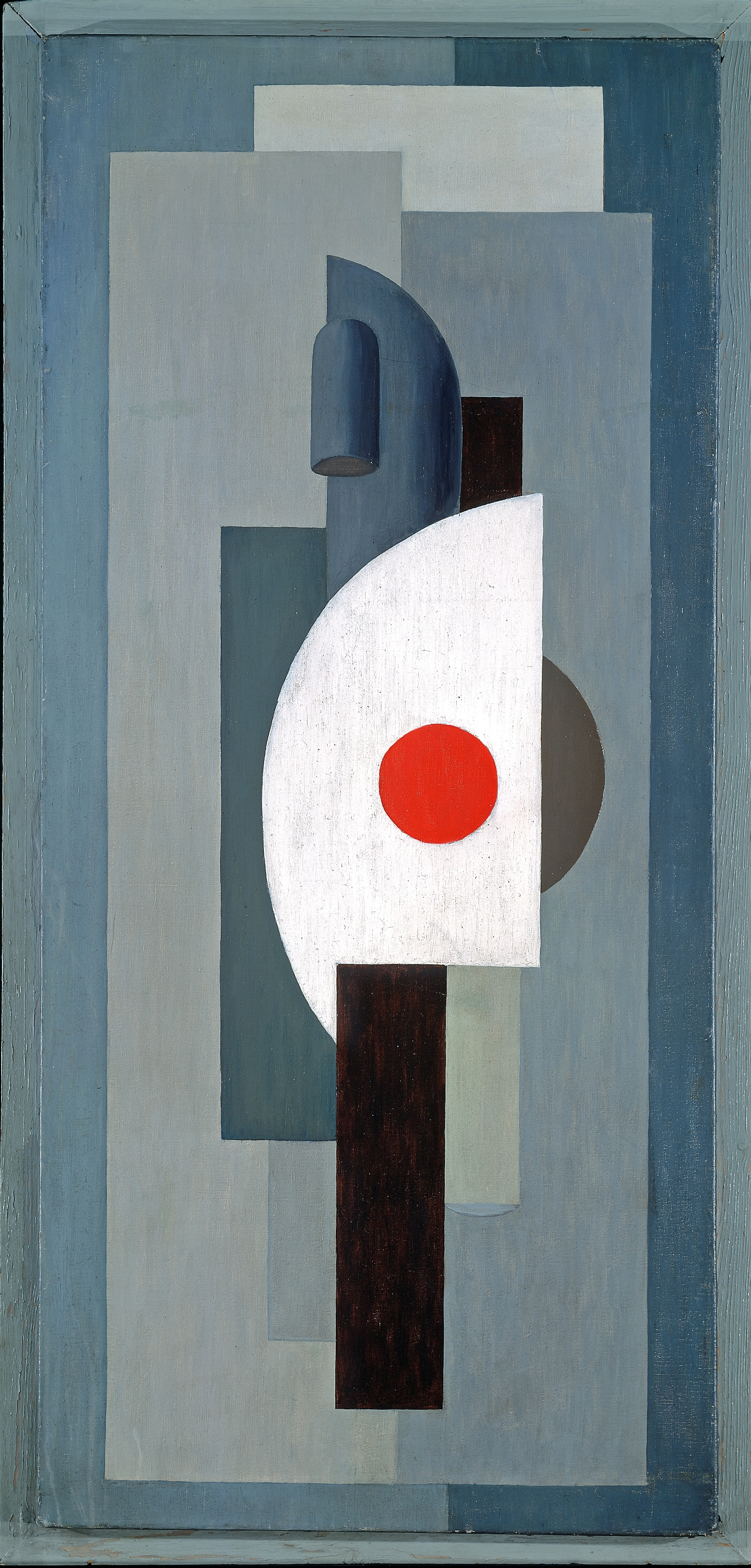
- Year: 1926
- Medium: alabaster
- Dimensions: 109.5 cm × 50 cm (43.1 in × 20 in)
- Location: National Museum of Art, Architecture and Design; Oslo

Armour is an oil painting by Norwegian painter Ragnhild Keyser (1889–1943), probably from 1926.

== Description ==
The painting's dimensions are 109.5 x 50 centimeters. The painting has been in the collection of the National Museum of Art, Architecture and Design in Oslo, since 1977. It represents a man carrying a white shield with a red dot on it, reminiscent of a target.

Ragnhild Keyser was one of Nordic painting's foremost abstract painters in the 1920s. She was inspired in Paris, by André Lhote and Fernand Léger, where she stayed from 1920 to 1935. She performed her most important works in the style since referred to as Scandinavian Cubism during the years 1925–1927.
