= Oreapolis, Nebraska =

Unincorporated community in Nebraska, U.S.

Coordinates: 41°02′51″N 95°55′06″W

Oreapolis is an unincorporated community in Cass County, Nebraska, United States.

== History ==
A post office was established at Oreapolis in 1859, and remained in operation until it was discontinued in 1864.
