= Bayonne, Nebraska =

- Ghost town
- Location within Nebraska Location within the United States
- Coordinates: 42.8°N 102°W
- Country: United States
- State: Nebraska
- County: Cherry

Bayonne is an extinct town in Cherry County, in the U.S. state of Nebraska. The GNIS classifies it as a populated place.

== History ==
A post office was established at Bayonne in 1914, and remained in operation until it was discontinued in 1934. The community was named after Bayonne, in France.
