= Osmond, Nebraska =

- City
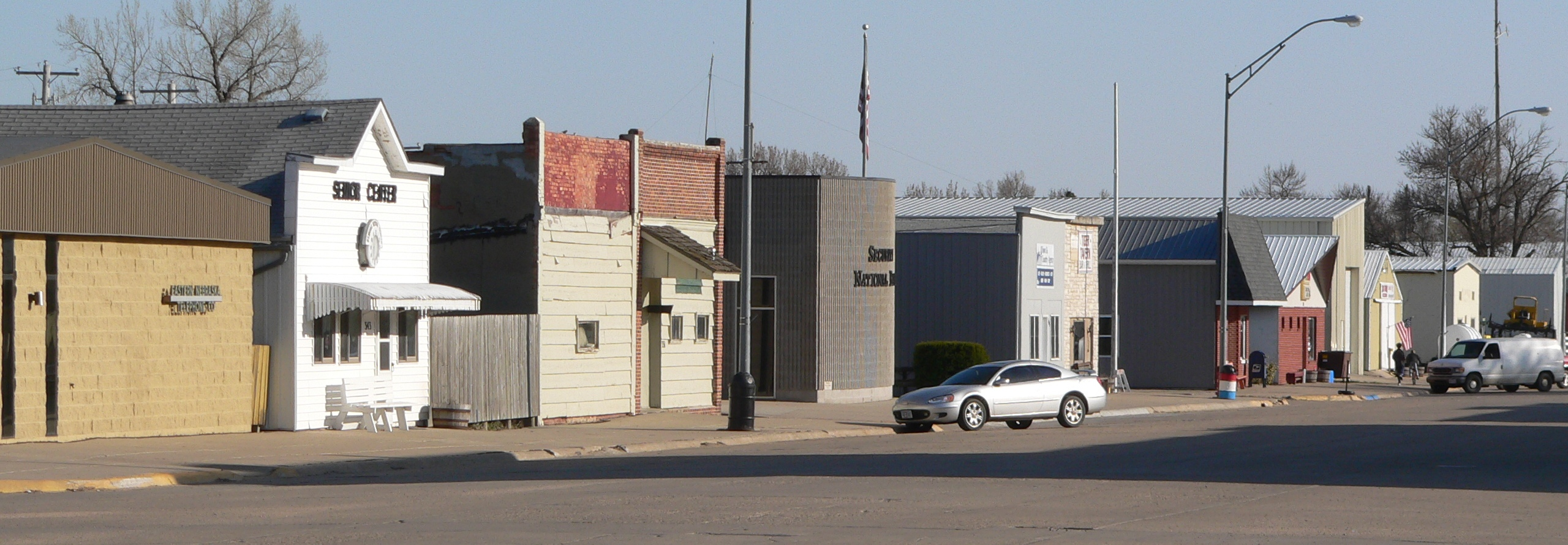
- Downtown Osmond: east side of State Street, looking south from 4th Street

- Location of Osmond, Nebraska
- Coordinates: 42°21′30″N 97°35′56″W
- Country: United States
- State: Nebraska
- County: Pierce

Area
  - Total: 0.80 sq mi (2.07 km^{2})
  - Land: 0.80 sq mi (2.06 km^{2})
  - Water: 0.0039 sq mi (0.01 km^{2})
- Elevation: 1,654 ft (504 m)

Population (2020)
  - Total: 794
  - Estimate (2021): 799
  - Density: 996.5/sq mi (384.77/km^{2})
- Time zone: UTC-6 (Central (CST))
  - Summer (DST): UTC-5 (CDT)
- ZIP code: 68765
- Area code: 402
- FIPS code: 31-37595
- GNIS feature ID: 2396097
- Website: cityofosmondne.org

Osmond is a city in Pierce County, Nebraska, United States. It is part of the Norfolk, Nebraska Micropolitan Statistical Area. The population was 791 at the 2020 census.

== History ==
Osmond was established in 1890 when the Chicago, Burlington and Quincy Railroad was extended to that point. It was likely named for a railroad official.

== Geography ==
According to the United States Census Bureau, the city has a total area of 0.80 square miles (2.07 km^{2}), all land.

== Demographics ==
Historical population
Census	Pop.	Note	%±
1900	501		—
1910	567		13.2%
1920	642		13.2%
1930	750		16.8%
1940	796		6.1%
1950	732		−8.0%
1960	719		−1.8%
1970	883		22.8%
1980	871		−1.4%
1990	774		−11.1%
2000	796		2.8%
2010	783		−1.6%
2020	794		1.4%
2021 (est.)	799		0.6%
U.S. Decennial Census

=== 2010 census ===
At the 2010 census there were 783 people in 319 households, including 215 families, in the city. The population density was 978.8 inhabitants per square mile (377.9/km^{2}). There were 360 housing units at an average density of 450.0 per square mile (173.7/km^{2}). The racial makup of the city was 97.8% White, 0.3% African American, 0.3% Asian, 0.5% from other races, and 1.1% from two or more races. Hispanic or Latino of any race were 1.8%.

Of the 319 households 31.7% had children under the age of 18 living with them, 58.0% were married couples living together, 6.6% had a female householder with no husband present, 2.8% had a male householder with no wife present, and 32.6% were non-families. 29.5% of households were one person and 16.6% were one person aged 65 or older. The average household size was 2.40 and the average family size was 2.94.

The median age was 43.1 years. 26.7% of residents were under the age of 18; 4.5% were between the ages of 18 and 24; 21.1% were from 25 to 44; 24.5% were from 45 to 64; and 23.2% were 65 or older. The gender makeup of the city was 47.3% male and 52.7% female.

=== 2000 census ===
At the 2000 census there were 796 people in 340 households, including 218 families, in the city. The population density was 1,133.4 inhabitants per square mile (437.6/km^{2}). There were 370 housing units at an average density of 526.8 per square mile (203.4/km^{2}). The racial makup of the city was 98.24% White, 0.13% African American, 0.25% Native American, 0.63% Asian, 0.75% from other races. Hispanic or Latino of any race were 1.26%.

Of the 340 households 28.5% had children under the age of 18 living with them, 55.3% were married couples living together, 6.5% had a female householder with no husband present, and 35.6% were non-families. 33.5% of households were one person and 21.8% were one person aged 65 or older. The average household size was 2.30 and the average family size was 2.94.

The age distribution was 25.6% under the age of 18, 4.9% from 18 to 24, 22.1% from 25 to 44, 20.4% from 45 to 64, and 27.0% 65 or older. The median age was 42 years. For every 100 females, there were 90.9 males. For every 100 females age 18 and over, there were 83.9 males.

As of 2000 the median income for a household in the city was $27,120, and the median family income was $35,000. Males had a median income of $28,750 versus $17,981 for females. The per capita income for the city was $15,356. About 5.8% of families and 7.1% of the population were below the poverty line, including 9.0% of those under age 18 and 7.9% of those age 65 or over.
