= Mayberry, Nebraska =

Unincorporated community in Nebraska, U.S.

Coordinates: 40°13′23″N 96°18′43″W

Mayberry is an unincorporated community in Pawnee County, Nebraska, in the United States.

== History ==
A post office was established at Mayberry in 1884, and remained in operation until it was discontinued in 1934. The community was named for Charles N. Mayberry, a pioneer settler.
