= Baiona =

Baiona can refer to at least two places:

- Baiona, the Basque and Occitan name for Bayonne, a city of Labourd, Basque Country, France
- Baiona, Pontevedra, a municipality in Galicia, Spain

== See also ==
- Bayonne (disambiguation)
