= Bookwalter, Nebraska =

Unincorporated community in Nebraska, United States

- Unincorporated Community
- Location within Nebraska Location within the United States
- Coordinates: 40.1°N 96.4°W
- Country: United States
- State: Nebraska
- County: Pawnee

Bookwalter is an unincorporated community in Pawnee County, Nebraska, United States.

== History ==
A post office was established at Bookwalter in 1890, and remained in operation until it was discontinued in 1919. The community was named for W. J. Bookwalter, the original owner of the town site.
