= Pierce County, Nebraska =

County in Nebraska, United States

- County
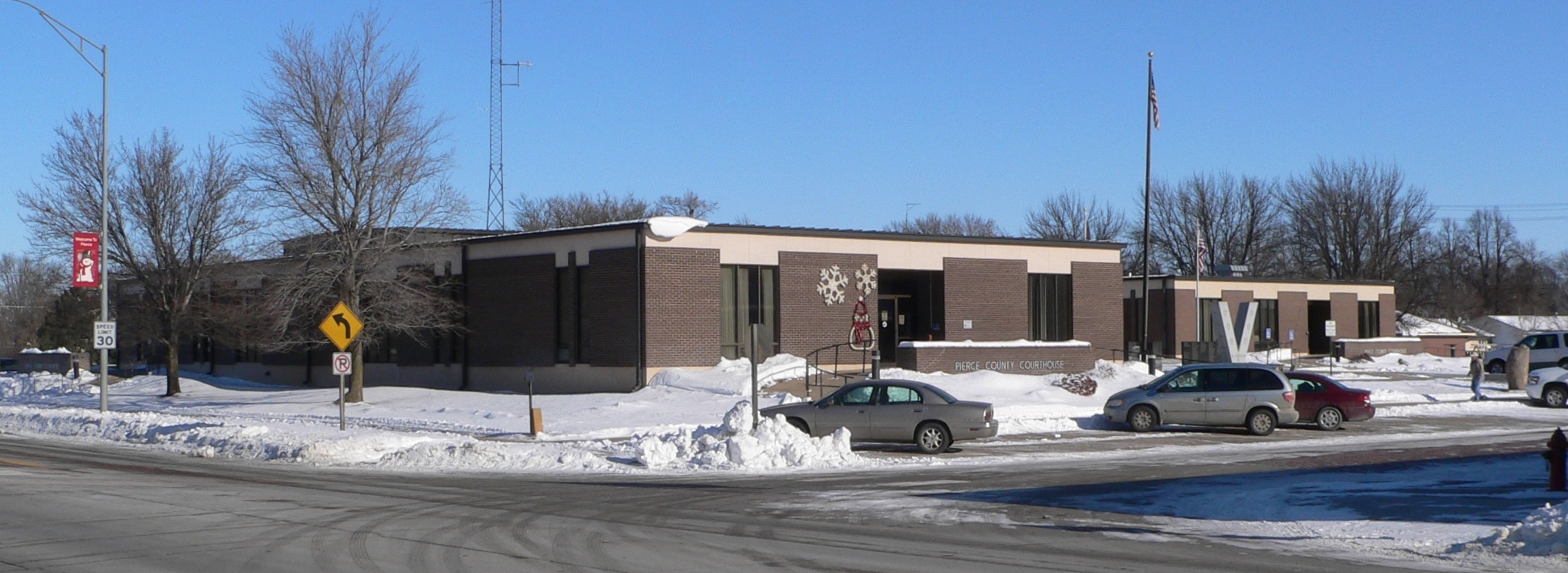
- Pierce County Courthouse in Pierce

- Location within the U.S. state of Nebraska
- Coordinates: 42°16′N 97°37′W
- Country: United States
- State: Nebraska
- Founded: 1859
- Named for: Franklin Pierce
- Seat: Pierce
- Largest city: Pierce

Area
  - Total: 575 sq mi (1,490 km^{2})
  - Land: 573 sq mi (1,480 km^{2})
  - Water: 1.3 sq mi (3.4 km^{2}) 0.2%

Population (2020)
  - Total: 7,317
  - Estimate (2025): 7,378 ▲
  - Density: 12.8/sq mi (4.93/km^{2})
- Time zone: UTC−6 (Central)
  - Summer (DST): UTC−5 (CDT)
- Congressional district: 3rd
- Website: piercecountyne.gov

Pierce County is a county in the U.S. state of Nebraska. As of the 2020 United States census, the population was 7,317. Its county seat is Pierce. The county was formed in 1859, and was named for US President Franklin Pierce. Pierce County is part of the Norfolk, NE Micropolitan Statistical Area. In the Nebraska license plate system, Pierce County is represented by the prefix 40 (it had the 40th-largest number of vehicles registered in the county when the license plate system was established in 1922).

== History ==
Some of Pierce County's earliest settlers were German Lutheran colonists who had traveled from Ixonia, Wisconsin, and had founded the nearby town of Norfolk.

== Geography ==
The Pierce County terrain consists of low rolling hills, sloping to the east and southeast. The north fork of the Elkhorn River flows southeastward through the central part of the county, while Dry Fork drains the lower western part, then discharges into the north fork of the Elkhorn. Most of the county's area is devoted to agriculture, often under central pivot irrigation.

The county has a total area of 575 square miles (1,490 km^{2}), of which 573 square miles (1,480 km^{2}) is land and 1.3 square miles (3.4 km^{2}) (0.2%) is water.

=== Major highways ===
- U.S. Highway 20
- U.S. Highway 81
- Nebraska Highway 13
- Nebraska Highway 98
- Nebraska Highway 121

=== Adjacent counties ===
- Cedar County – northeast
- Wayne County – east
- Stanton County – southeast
- Madison County – south
- Antelope County – west
- Knox County – north

=== Protected areas ===
- Willow Creek Recreation Area

== Demographics ==
Historical population
Census	Pop.	Note	%±
1870	152		—
1880	1,202		690.8%
1890	4,864		304.7%
1900	8,445		73.6%
1910	10,122		19.9%
1920	10,681		5.5%
1930	11,080		3.7%
1940	10,211		−7.8%
1950	9,405		−7.9%
1960	8,722		−7.3%
1970	8,493		−2.6%
1980	8,481		−0.1%
1990	7,827		−7.7%
2000	7,857		0.4%
2010	7,266		−7.5%
2020	7,317		0.7%
2025 (est.)	7,378	▲	0.8%
US Decennial Census; 1790-1960 1900-1990; 1990-2000 2010 2020 2022

=== 2020 census ===
As of the 2020 census, the county had a population of 7,317. The median age was 41.0 years. 25.2% of residents were under the age of 18 and 19.6% of residents were 65 years of age or older. For every 100 females there were 101.0 males, and for every 100 females age 18 and over there were 101.0 males age 18 and over.

The racial makeup of the county was 95.6% White, 0.4% Black or African American, 0.3% American Indian and Alaska Native, 0.2% Asian, 0.0% Native Hawaiian and Pacific Islander, 0.7% from some other race, and 2.7% from two or more races. Hispanic or Latino residents of any race comprised 1.9% of the population.

0.0% of residents lived in urban areas, while 100.0% lived in rural areas.

There were 2,887 households in the county, of which 31.3% had children under the age of 18 living with them and 18.6% had a female householder with no spouse or partner present. About 24.6% of all households were made up of individuals and 12.5% had someone living alone who was 65 years of age or older.

There were 3,118 housing units, of which 7.4% were vacant. Among occupied housing units, 80.7% were owner-occupied and 19.3% were renter-occupied. The homeowner vacancy rate was 1.4% and the rental vacancy rate was 6.5%.

=== 2000 census ===
As of the 2000 United States census, there were 7,857 people, 2,979 households, and 2,141 families in the county. The population density was 14 people per square mile (5.4 people/km^{2}). There were 3,247 housing units at an average density of 6 units per square mile (2.3/km^{2}).

The racial makeup of the county was 98.65% White, 0.08% Black or African American, 0.36% Native American, 0.20% Asian, 0.03% Pacific Islander, 0.23% from other races, and 0.46% from two or more races. 0.71% of the population were Hispanic or Latino of any race.

There were 2,979 households, out of which 35.30% had children under the age of 18 living with them, 63.40% were married couples living together, 5.70% had a female householder with no husband present, and 28.10% were non-families. 25.70% of all households were made up of individuals, and 13.70% had someone living alone who was 65 years of age or older. The average household size was 2.59 and the average family size was 3.14.

The county population contained 29.00% under the age of 18, 7.00% from 18 to 24, 26.00% from 25 to 44, 20.90% from 45 to 64, and 17.20% who were 65 years of age or older. The median age was 38 years. For every 100 females, there were 100.00 males. For every 100 females age 18 and over, there were 95.10 males.

The median income for a household in the county was $32,239, and the median income for a family was $40,500. Males had a median income of $26,563 versus $20,237 for females. The per capita income for the county was $15,980. About 8.80% of families and 11.80% of the population were below the poverty line, including 14.20% of those under age 18 and 12.90% of those age 65 or over.

== Communities ==
=== Cities ===
- Osmond
- Pierce (county seat)
- Plainview

=== Villages ===
- Foster
- Hadar
- McLean

=== Unincorporated communities ===
- Breslau
- Wee Town

== Politics ==
Pierce County voters have been reliably Republican for decades. In no national election since 1936 has the county selected the Democratic Party candidate (as of 2024).

United States presidential election results for Pierce County, Nebraska
Year	Republican		Democratic		Third party(ies)	
Year	No.	%	No.	%	No.	%
1900	919	49.54%	913	49.22%	23	1.24%
1904	1,122	58.65%	616	32.20%	175	9.15%
1908	1,067	48.54%	1,095	49.82%	36	1.64%
1912	694	32.52%	948	44.42%	492	23.06%
1916	1,228	53.60%	1,030	44.96%	33	1.44%
1920	2,478	75.11%	743	22.52%	78	2.36%
1924	1,570	42.36%	760	20.51%	1,376	37.13%
1928	2,542	61.45%	1,586	38.34%	9	0.22%
1932	1,128	27.23%	2,980	71.93%	35	0.84%
1936	2,016	44.85%	2,357	52.44%	122	2.71%
1940	3,271	69.30%	1,449	30.70%	0	0.00%
1944	2,956	71.06%	1,204	28.94%	0	0.00%
1948	1,866	57.43%	1,383	42.57%	0	0.00%
1952	3,234	78.06%	909	21.94%	0	0.00%
1956	2,800	70.85%	1,152	29.15%	0	0.00%
1960	2,963	72.80%	1,107	27.20%	0	0.00%
1964	1,965	54.64%	1,631	45.36%	0	0.00%
1968	2,408	73.44%	674	20.56%	197	6.01%
1972	2,451	78.96%	653	21.04%	0	0.00%
1976	2,172	66.95%	1,004	30.95%	68	2.10%
1980	2,938	80.74%	517	14.21%	184	5.06%
1984	3,017	84.06%	545	15.19%	27	0.75%
1988	2,474	72.79%	914	26.89%	11	0.32%
1992	1,853	52.02%	611	17.15%	1,098	30.83%
1996	1,923	62.39%	697	22.62%	462	14.99%
2000	2,534	78.99%	570	17.77%	104	3.24%
2004	2,824	83.11%	546	16.07%	28	0.82%
2008	2,385	73.93%	783	24.27%	58	1.80%
2012	2,707	78.90%	637	18.57%	87	2.54%
2016	3,052	84.08%	382	10.52%	196	5.40%
2020	3,462	86.29%	480	11.96%	70	1.74%
2024	3,420	87.47%	446	11.41%	44	1.13%

== See also ==
- National Register of Historic Places listings in Pierce County, Nebraska
