= Carns, Nebraska =

- Ghost town
- Location within Nebraska Location within the United States
- Coordinates: 42.7°N 99.5°W
- Country: United States
- State: Nebraska
- County: Keya Paha

Carns is an extinct town in Keya Paha County, in the U.S. state of Nebraska.

Carns bears the name of a pioneer settler. A post office called Carns was established in 1879, and remained in operation until 1943. An early variant name of the post office may have been Elm Grove.
