= Saltillo, Nebraska =

Unincorporated community in Nebraska, U.S.

Coordinates: 40°42′00″N 96°40′57″W

Saltillo (/sælˈtɪloʊ/ sal-TEE-oh) was an unincorporated community in Lancaster County, Nebraska, United States.

== History ==
The settlement of Saltillo was formerly located along the Salt Creek where the corners of Grant, Centerville, Yankee Hill, and Saltillo townships meet. Originally a community was planned at the site to be named Olathe. In 1862, John Cadman built a road ranch called Saltillo Station in the area to provide lodgings for travelers along the Oregon Trail between Nebraska City and Fort Kearny. A post office was established at Saltillo in 1862, and remained in operation until it was discontinued in 1906. The community was likely named after the city of Saltillo, Mexico. The name is derived from the Spanish word salto, meaning leap, the diminutive suffix renders the meaning of the name "little leap."

Saltillo remained a small community for its entire existence, never exceeding a population of 50 people. The village economy relied heavily on wagon train traffic from the Oregon Trail, which became obsolete in 1865 with the construction of the Transcontinental Railroad. Two railroads passed through Saltillo, the Atchison and Nebraska Railroad in 1872 and the a branch line of the Union Pacific called the Omaha and Republican Valley Railroad in 1883. The Atchison and Nebraska Railroad was later sold to Chicago, Burlington & Quincy in 1908.

Plat maps produced in 1903 show the village with three streets and the path of Salt Creek flowing through roughly half of the lots. Frequent flooding, a lack of travelers and thus income, as well as the continuous growth of nearby Lincoln all sent the population of Saltillo into decline. By the 1950s, the last visible remnant of Saltillo was the grain elevator which was torn down in 1953.

== See also ==
- List of ghost towns in Nebraska
