= Armour, Nebraska =

- Ghost Town
- Location within Nebraska
- Coordinates: 40.1°N 96.4°W
- Country: United States
- State: Nebraska
- County: Pawnee

Armour is an extinct town in Pawnee County, in the U.S. state of Nebraska.

A post office was established at Armour in 1890, and remained in operation until 1934. The community may be named after the Armour and Company.
