= York County, Nebraska =

County in Nebraska, United States

- County
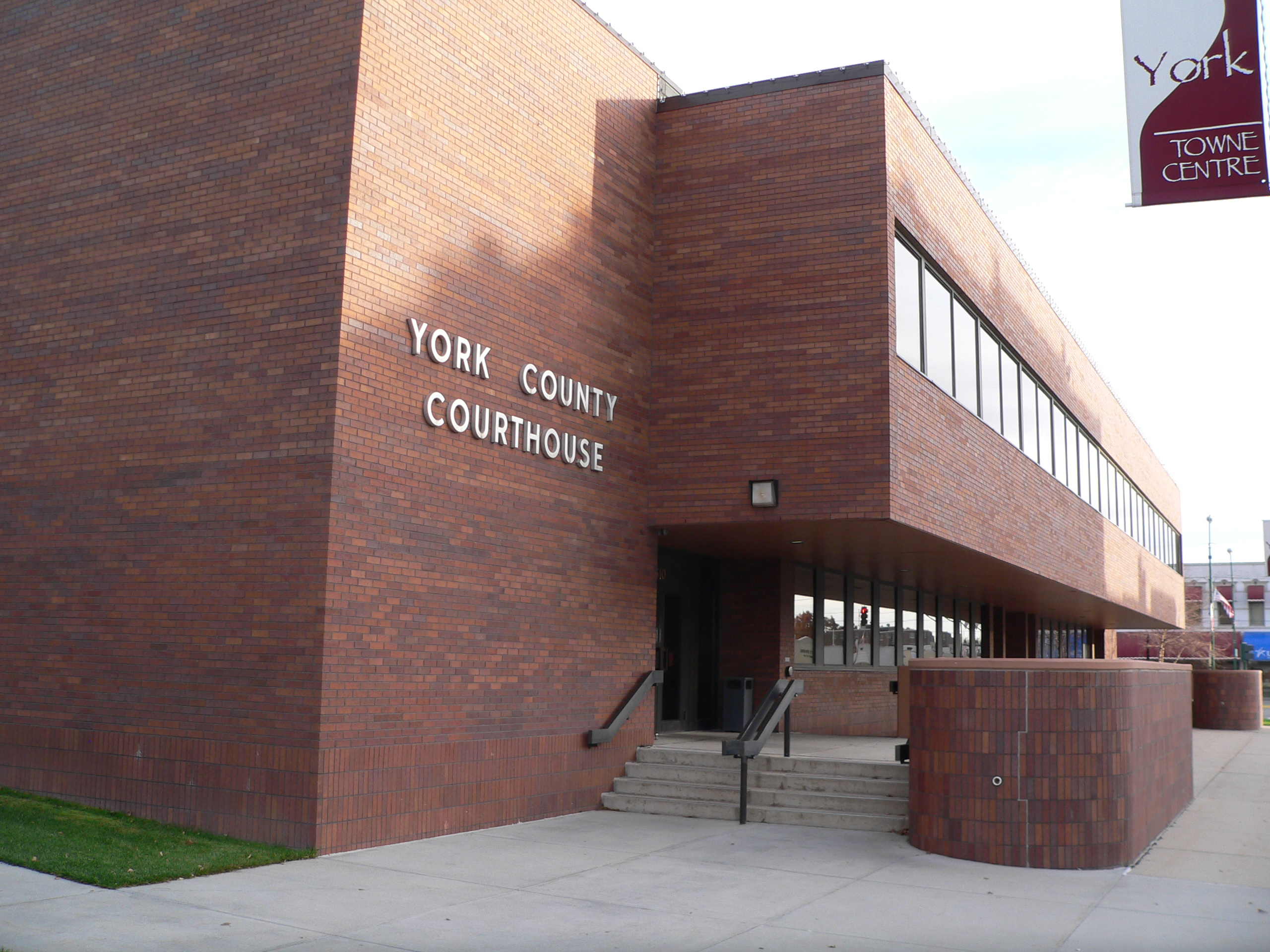
- The York County Courthouse in York

- Location within the U.S. state of Nebraska
- Coordinates: 40.873056°N 97.596742°W
- Country: United States
- State: Nebraska
- Created: March 16, 1855
- Organized: April 26, 1870
- Seat: York
- Largest city: York

Area
  - Total: 575.829 sq mi (1,491.39 km^{2})
  - Land: 572.516 sq mi (1,482.81 km^{2})
  - Water: 3.313 sq mi (8.58 km^{2}) 0.58%

Population (2020)
  - Total: 14,125
  - Estimate (2025): 14,564 ▲
  - Density: 24.672/sq mi (9.5258/km^{2})
- Time zone: UTC−6 (Central)
  - Summer (DST): UTC−5 (CDT)
- Area code: 402 and 531
- Congressional district: 3rd
- Website: yorkcounty.ne.gov
- • Nebraska county number 93 • Nebraska license plate prefix 17

York County is a county in the U.S. state of Nebraska. As of the 2020 census, the population was 14,125, and was estimated to be 14,564 in 2025. The county seat and the largest city is York.

In the Nebraska license plate system, York County was represented by the prefix "17" (as it had the 17th-largest number of vehicles registered in the state when the license plate system was established in 1922).

== History ==
York County was created on March 16, 1855 and organized in 1870. Sources differ on the origin of the county's name: some state it was named after York in England, while others maintain it was named by early settlers from York County, Pennsylvania.

== Geography ==
According to the United States Census Bureau, the county has a total area of 575.829 square miles (1,491.39 km^{2}), of which 572.516 square miles (1,482.81 km^{2}) is land and 3.313 square miles (8.58 km^{2}) (0.58%) is water. It is the 54th-largest county in Nebraska by total area.

The terrain of York County consists of rolling prairie, mostly devoted to agriculture. The ground slopes toward the Platte River, to the northwest.

=== Major highways ===
- Interstate 80
- U.S. Highway 34
- U.S. Highway 81
- Nebraska Highway 69

=== Adjacent counties ===
- Butler County – northeast
- Seward County – east
- Saline County – southeast
- Fillmore County – south
- Clay County – southwest
- Hamilton County – west
- Polk County – north

=== Protected areas ===
- Kirkpatrick Basin North State Wildlife Area
- Kirkpatrick Basin South State Wildlife Area
- Renquist Basin State Wildlife Management Area
- Waco Waterfowl Production Area

== Demographics ==
Historical population
Census	Pop.	Note	%±
1870	604		—
1880	11,170		1,749.3%
1890	17,279		54.7%
1900	18,205		5.4%
1910	18,721		2.8%
1920	17,146		−8.4%
1930	17,239		0.5%
1940	14,874		−13.7%
1950	14,346		−3.5%
1960	13,724		−4.3%
1970	13,685		−0.3%
1980	14,798		8.1%
1990	14,428		−2.5%
2000	14,598		1.2%
2010	13,665		−6.4%
2020	14,125		3.4%
2025 (est.)	14,564	▲	3.1%
U.S. Decennial Census; 1790–1960 1900–1990; 1990–2000 2010–2020

=== 2020 census ===
As of the 2020 census, there were 14,125 people. The median age was 40.3 years. 22.9% of residents were under the age of 18 and 20.5% of residents were 65 years of age or older. For every 100 females there were 97.8 males, and for every 100 females age 18 and over there were 94.8 males age 18 and over.

The racial makeup of the county was 90.5% White, 1.2% Black or African American, 0.6% American Indian and Alaska Native, 0.7% Asian, 0.0% Native Hawaiian and Pacific Islander, 2.8% from some other race, and 4.1% from two or more races. Hispanic or Latino residents of any race comprised 5.9% of the population.

56.4% of residents lived in urban areas, while 43.6% lived in rural areas.

There were 5,663 households in the county, of which 27.2% had children under the age of 18 living with them and 22.2% had a female householder with no spouse or partner present. About 31.0% of all households were made up of individuals and 13.8% had someone living alone who was 65 years of age or older.

There were 6,320 housing units, of which 10.4% were vacant. Among occupied housing units, 70.2% were owner-occupied and 29.8% were renter-occupied. The homeowner vacancy rate was 2.5% and the rental vacancy rate was 11.4%.

=== 2000 census ===
As of the 2000 census, there were 14,598 people, 5,722 households, and 3,931 families in the county. The population density was 25 people per square mile (9.7 people/km^{2}). There were 6,172 housing units at an average density of 11 per square mile (4.2/km^{2}). The racial makeup of the county was 96.78% White, 0.96% Black or African American, 0.29% Native American, 0.49% Asian, 0.08% Pacific Islander, 0.64% from other races, and 0.77% from two or more races. 1.40% of the population were Hispanic or Latino of any race. 52.0% were of German, 8.2% Irish, 7.2% English and 5.1% Swedish ancestry.

There were 5,722 households, out of which 31.10% had children under the age of 18 living with them, 60.20% were married couples living together, 6.00% had a female householder with no husband present, and 31.30% were non-families. 27.50% of all households were made up of individuals, and 14.00% had someone living alone who was 65 years of age or older. The average household size was 2.42 and the average family size was 2.96.

The county population contained 25.30% under the age of 18, 9.00% from 18 to 24, 25.40% from 25 to 44, 23.00% from 45 to 64, and 17.40% who were 65 years of age or older. The median age was 39 years. For every 100 females there were 91.50 males. For every 100 females age 18 and over, there were 88.80 males.

The median income for a household in the county was $37,093, and the median income for a family was $44,741. Males had a median income of $30,658 versus $19,874 for females. The per capita income for the county was $17,670. About 6.00% of families and 8.50% of the population were below the poverty line, including 9.90% of those under age 18 and 7.10% of those age 65 or over.

== Communities ==
=== Cities ===
- Henderson
- York (county seat)

=== Villages ===
- Benedict
- Bradshaw
- Gresham
- Lushton
- McCool Junction
- Thayer
- Waco

=== Former Communities ===
- Charlestown
- Houston

== Government ==
The County Board of Commissioners is the executive and legislative authority of the county.

== Politics ==
York County voters have traditionally been strong Republicans. In only one national election since 1916 has the county selected the Democratic Party candidate (as of 2024).

Political Party	Number of registered voters (February 1, 2026)	Percent
Republican	6,258	67.61%
Independent	1,562	16.88%
Democratic	1,286	13.89%
Libertarian	100	1.08%
Legal Marijuana Now	50	0.54%
Total	9,256	100.00%

United States presidential election results for York County, Nebraska
Year	Republican		Democratic		Third party(ies)	
Year	No.	%	No.	%	No.	%
1900	2,207	53.05%	1,871	44.98%	82	1.97%
1904	2,529	64.16%	754	19.13%	659	16.72%
1908	2,209	50.39%	2,042	46.58%	133	3.03%
1912	962	23.40%	1,886	45.88%	1,263	30.72%
1916	2,011	46.22%	2,206	50.70%	134	3.08%
1920	4,265	66.87%	1,857	29.12%	256	4.01%
1924	4,110	58.66%	1,778	25.37%	1,119	15.97%
1928	5,769	74.16%	1,979	25.44%	31	0.40%
1932	3,573	47.14%	3,920	51.72%	86	1.13%
1936	4,554	54.12%	3,741	44.46%	120	1.43%
1940	5,322	70.75%	2,200	29.25%	0	0.00%
1944	4,885	72.99%	1,808	27.01%	0	0.00%
1948	3,960	65.44%	2,091	34.56%	0	0.00%
1952	5,742	79.64%	1,468	20.36%	0	0.00%
1956	5,065	76.35%	1,569	23.65%	0	0.00%
1960	5,205	74.69%	1,764	25.31%	0	0.00%
1964	3,410	54.63%	2,832	45.37%	0	0.00%
1968	3,923	72.39%	1,237	22.83%	259	4.78%
1972	4,651	77.92%	1,318	22.08%	0	0.00%
1976	4,223	69.62%	1,665	27.45%	178	2.93%
1980	5,089	76.71%	1,131	17.05%	414	6.24%
1984	5,147	82.08%	1,124	17.92%	0	0.00%
1988	4,765	72.78%	1,751	26.75%	31	0.47%
1992	3,783	53.94%	1,385	19.75%	1,845	26.31%
1996	4,266	65.56%	1,653	25.40%	588	9.04%
2000	4,816	74.55%	1,407	21.78%	237	3.67%
2004	5,393	79.34%	1,304	19.18%	100	1.47%
2008	4,848	73.81%	1,607	24.47%	113	1.72%
2012	4,874	76.70%	1,373	21.61%	108	1.70%
2016	4,700	73.66%	1,186	18.59%	495	7.76%
2020	5,337	74.53%	1,630	22.76%	194	2.71%
2024	5,234	74.56%	1,648	23.48%	138	1.97%

== Education ==
School districts include:

- Centennial Public Schools
- Cross County Community Schools
- Exeter-Milligan Public Schools
- Heartland Community Schools
- High Plains Community Schools
- Hampton Public Schools
- McCool Junction Public Schools
- Sutton Public Schools
- York Public Schools

== See also ==
- National Register of Historic Places listings in York County, Nebraska
- York News-Times
