= Reptile scale =

Scales covering the skin of Reptiles

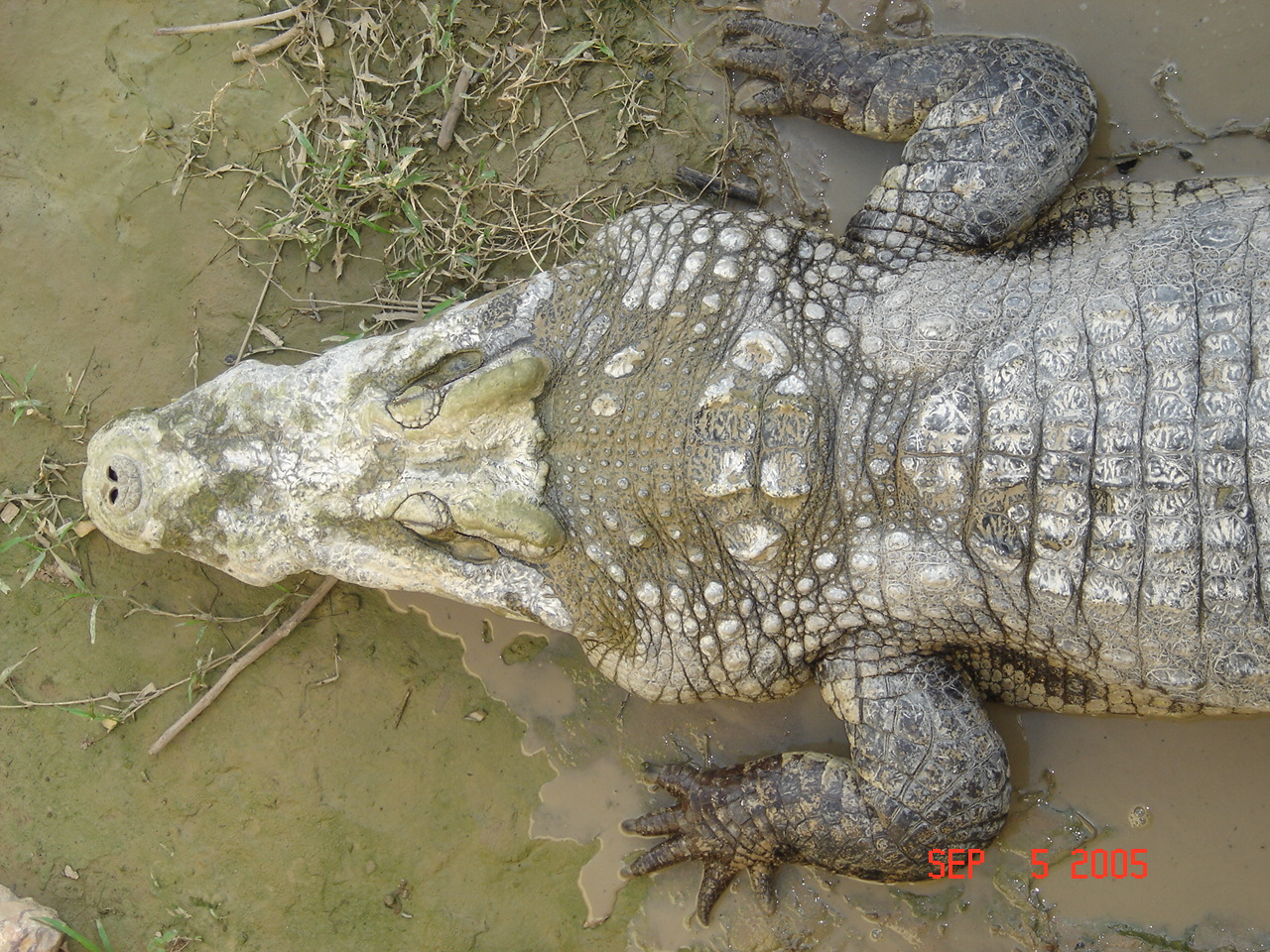
Scutes on a crocodile

Reptile skin is covered with scutes or scales which, along with many other characteristics, distinguish reptiles from animals of other classes. They are made of alpha and beta-keratin and are formed from the epidermis (contrary to fish, in which the scales are formed from the dermis). The scales may be ossified or tubercular, as in the case of lizards, or modified elaborately, as in the case of snakes.

The scales on the top of lizard and snake heads has also been called pileus, after the Latin word for cap, referring to the fact that these scales sit on the skull like a cap.

== Lizard scales ==
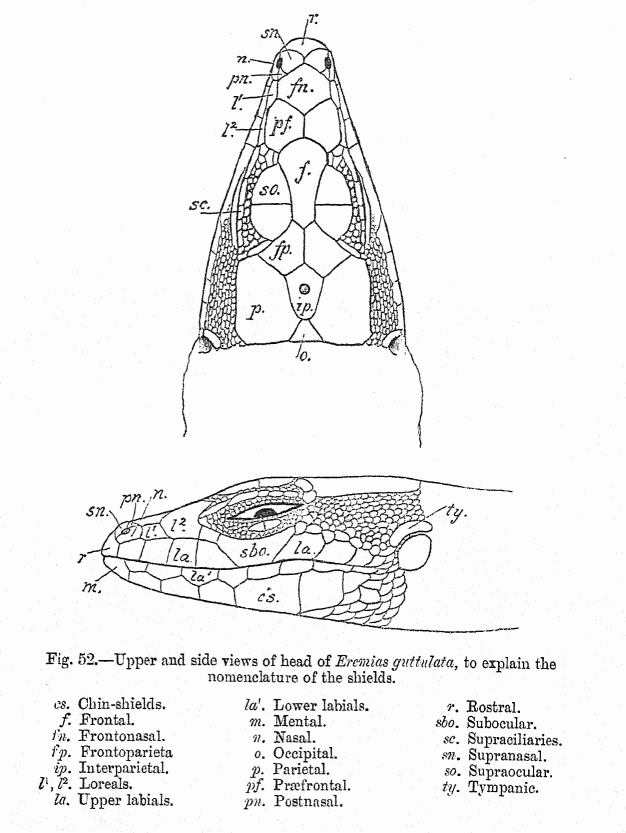
Lizard head scales, from Boulenger 1890: 168.

Lizard scales vary in form from tubercular to platelike, or imbricate (overlapping). These scales, which on the surface are composed of horny (keratinized) epidermis, may have bony plates underlying them; these plates are called osteoderms.

Lizard scales may differ strongly in form on different parts of the lizard and are often of use in taxonomy to differentiate species (or higher taxa, such as families). For instance, members of the family Lacertidae have large head plates (Figure 2) while geckos have no such "plates" but only very small head scales.

While scales are an integral part of reptile taxonomy, the terminology is not entirely consistent. For instance, the scales between the nostrils are sometimes called supranasals and sometimes internasals.

== Snake scales ==
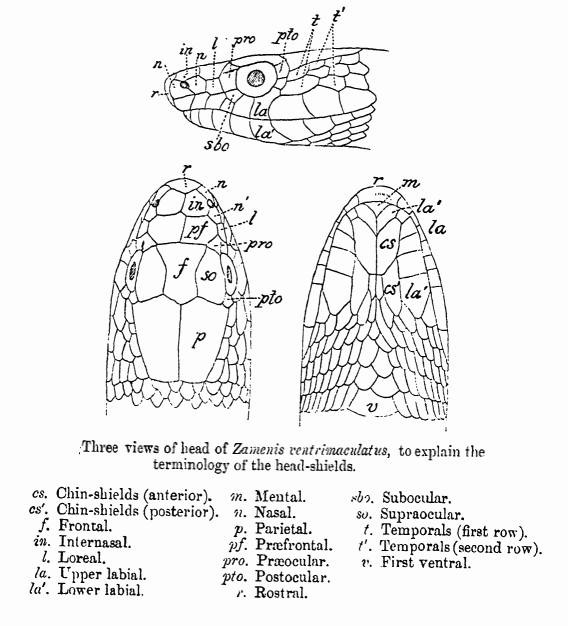
Terminology of shields on the head of a snake.

Snakes are entirely covered with scales or scutes of various shapes and sizes. Scales protect the body of the snake, aid it in locomotion, allow moisture to be retained within and give simple or complex colouration patterns which help in camouflage and anti-predator display. In some snakes, scales have been modified over time to serve other functions such as 'eyelash' fringes, and protective covers for the eyes with the most distinctive modification being the rattle of the North American rattlesnakes.

Role in identification. The shape and arrangement of scales is used to identify snake species. The shape and number of scales on the head, back and belly are characteristic to family, genus and species. Scales have a nomenclature analogous to the position on the body. In "advanced" (Caenophidian) snakes, the broad belly scales and rows of dorsal scales correspond to the vertebrae, allowing scientists to count the vertebrae without dissection.

Nomenclature. While reptile scales use a sophisticated naming system (see figures), there has been a certain confusion because of synonymous names. For instance, the ventral scales are often called ventrals but gastrosteges is common in the older literature. In more recent publications they are often abbreviated as VSR (for ventral scale rows) or simply V.

== Scutes ==
In crocodiles and turtles, the dermal armour is formed from the deeper dermis rather than the epidermis, and does not form the same sort of overlapping structure as snake scales. These dermal scales are more properly called scutes. Similar dermal scutes are found in the feet of birds and tails of some mammals, and are believed to be the primitive form of dermal armour in reptiles.

== Moulting ==
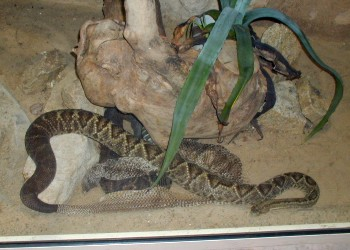
Cascavel (Crotalus durissus), a rattlesnake, seen moulting

The shedding of scales is called moulting or sloughing.

Moulting performs a number of functions: firstly, the old and worn skin is replaced; secondly, it helps to get rid of parasites such as mites and ticks. Renewal of the skin by moulting is supposed to allow growth in some animals such as insects, however this view has been disputed in the case of snakes.

In the case of lizards, this coating is shed periodically and usually comes off in flakes, but some lizards (such as those with elongated bodies) shed the skin in a single piece. Some geckos will eat their own shed skin.

Snakes always shed the complete outer layer of skin in one piece. Snake scales are not discrete but extensions of the epidermis, hence they are not shed separately but are ejected as a complete contiguous outer layer of skin during each moult, akin to a sock being turned inside out. Moulting is repeated periodically throughout a snake's life. Before a moult, the snake stops eating and often hides or moves to a safe place. Just prior to shedding, the skin becomes dull and dry looking and the snake's eyes turn cloudy or blue-coloured. The old layer of skin splits near the mouth and the snake wriggles out, aided by rubbing against rough surfaces. In many cases the cast skin peels backward over the body from head to tail, in one piece like an old sock. A new, larger, and brighter layer of skin has formed underneath. An older snake may shed its skin only once or twice a year, but a younger snake that is still growing may shed up to four times a year.

== See also ==
- Anatomical terms of location
- Fish scale
