= National Register of Historic Places listings in Cedar County, Nebraska =

Location of Cedar County in Nebraska

Cedar County, Nebraska, United States, has 14 properties and districts listed on the National Register of Historic Places. One property was once listed on the register, but has since been removed.

The locations of National Register properties and districts for which the latitude and longitude coordinates are included below may be seen in a map.

This National Park Service list is complete through NPS recent listings posted October 30, 2026.

== Current listings ==
	Name on the Register	Image	Date listed	Location	City or town	Description
1	Cedar County Courthouse	Cedar County Courthouse	January 10, 1990 (#89002214)	Broadway Ave. between Centre and Franklin Sts. 42°37′12″N 97°15′50″W	Hartington	
2	City Hall and Auditorium	City Hall and Auditorium	July 21, 1983 (#83001080)	101 N. Broadway; 42°37′15″N 97°15′49″W	Hartington	A Prairie School multi-use municipal building designed by William L. Steele.
3	Couser Barn	Couser Barn	July 17, 1986 (#86001714)	Address Restricted	Laurel	
4	Hartington Carnegie Library		June 27, 2019 (#100004137)	106 S. Broadway Ave. 42°37′12″N 97°15′53″W	Hartington	
5	Hartington Downtown Historic District		July 1, 2019 (#100004136)	Broadway Ave. from Centre St. to Railroad St.; Main St. From Madison Ave. to Alley W of Broadway Ave. 42°37′21″N 97°15′53″W	Hartington	
6	Hartington Hotel	Hartington Hotel	November 26, 2003 (#03001219)	202 North Broadway; 42°37′18″N 97°15′53″W	Hartington	
7	Immaculate Conception Catholic Church and Rectory	Immaculate Conception Catholic Church and Rectory	July 5, 2001 (#01000711)	102 and 108 E. 9th St. 42°48′33″N 97°14′52″W	St. Helena	
8	Meridian Bridge	Meridian Bridge	June 17, 1993 (#93000537)	U.S. Route 81 over the Missouri River, just south of Yankton, South Dakota; 42°52′05″N 97°23′37″W	South Yankton	Extends into Yankton County, South Dakota
9	St. Boniface Catholic Church Complex	St. Boniface Catholic Church Complex	July 21, 1983 (#83001081)	Main St. 42°47′10″N 97°22′25″W	Menominee	
10	Saints Peter and Paul Catholic Church Complex	Saints Peter and Paul Catholic Church Complex	July 5, 2000 (#00000765)	106 W. 889th Rd. 42°42′53″N 97°15′03″W	Bow Valley	
11	Saints Philip and James Parochial School	Saints Philip and James Parochial School	November 26, 2003 (#03001211)	89039 570 Ave. 42°44′03″N 97°08′37″W	Wynot	
12	Schulte Archeological Site		July 30, 1974 (#74001103)	Address Restricted	St. Helena	
13	Wiseman Archeological Site		December 2, 1974 (#74001104)	Address Restricted	Wynot	
14	Franz Zavadil Farmstead	Franz Zavadil Farmstead	January 31, 1985 (#85000173)	Eastern half of the southeastern quarter of Section 35, Township 33 North, Range 1 West; 42°47′32″N 97°23′14″W	Menominee	

== Former listings ==
	Name on the Register	Image	Date listed	Date removed	Location	City or town	Description
1	Bow Valley Mills	Bow Valley Mills	November 17, 1978 (#78003402)	November 15, 2016	North of Wynot; 42°45′43″N 97°10′02″W	Wynot	Mill building no longer at site; concrete spillway across road is still present.

== See also ==
- List of National Historic Landmarks in Nebraska
- National Register of Historic Places listings in Nebraska
