= Nebraska Highway 137 =

State highway in Nebraska, U.S.

State Highway 137
- N-137 highlighted in red

Route information
- Maintained by NDOT
- Length: 29.74 mi (47.86 km)
- Existed: 1950–present

Major junctions
- South end: US 20 in Newport
- N-12 east of Burton
- North end: SD 47 at the South Dakota border near Brocksburg

Location
- Country: United States
- State: Nebraska
- Counties: Rock, Keya Paha

Highway system
- Nebraska State Highway System; Interstate; US; State; Link; Spur; State Spurs; Recreation
← US 136	→ US 138

Nebraska Highway 137 is a highway in northern Nebraska. Its southern terminus is at U.S. Highway 20 in Newport. Its northern terminus is at the South Dakota border where it continues as South Dakota Highway 47.

== Route description ==
Nebraska Highway 137 begins in Newport at an intersection with US 20. It heads northward, passing through numerous unincorporated areas of farmland along the way. It meets NE 12 east of Burton, and runs concurrently with it to the northeast for about 4.5 miles (7.2 km). NE 137 then splits off to the north, where it passes through the Jamison unincorporated area. It then continues northward to the South Dakota border, where it continues in that state as SD 47.

== Major intersections ==
County	Location	mi	km	Destinations	Notes
Rock	Newport	0.00	0.00	US 20	
Keya Paha		22.57	36.32	N-12 west	Southern end of N-12 overlap
Keya Paha		27.06	43.55	N-12 east	Northern end of N-12 overlap
Keya Paha		29.74	47.86	SD 47 north	Continuation into South Dakota
1.000 mi = 1.609 km; 1.000 km = 0.621 mi: Concurrency terminus
