= Immaculate Conception Catholic Church and Rectory =

Historic church in Nebraska, United States

- U.S. National Register of Historic Places
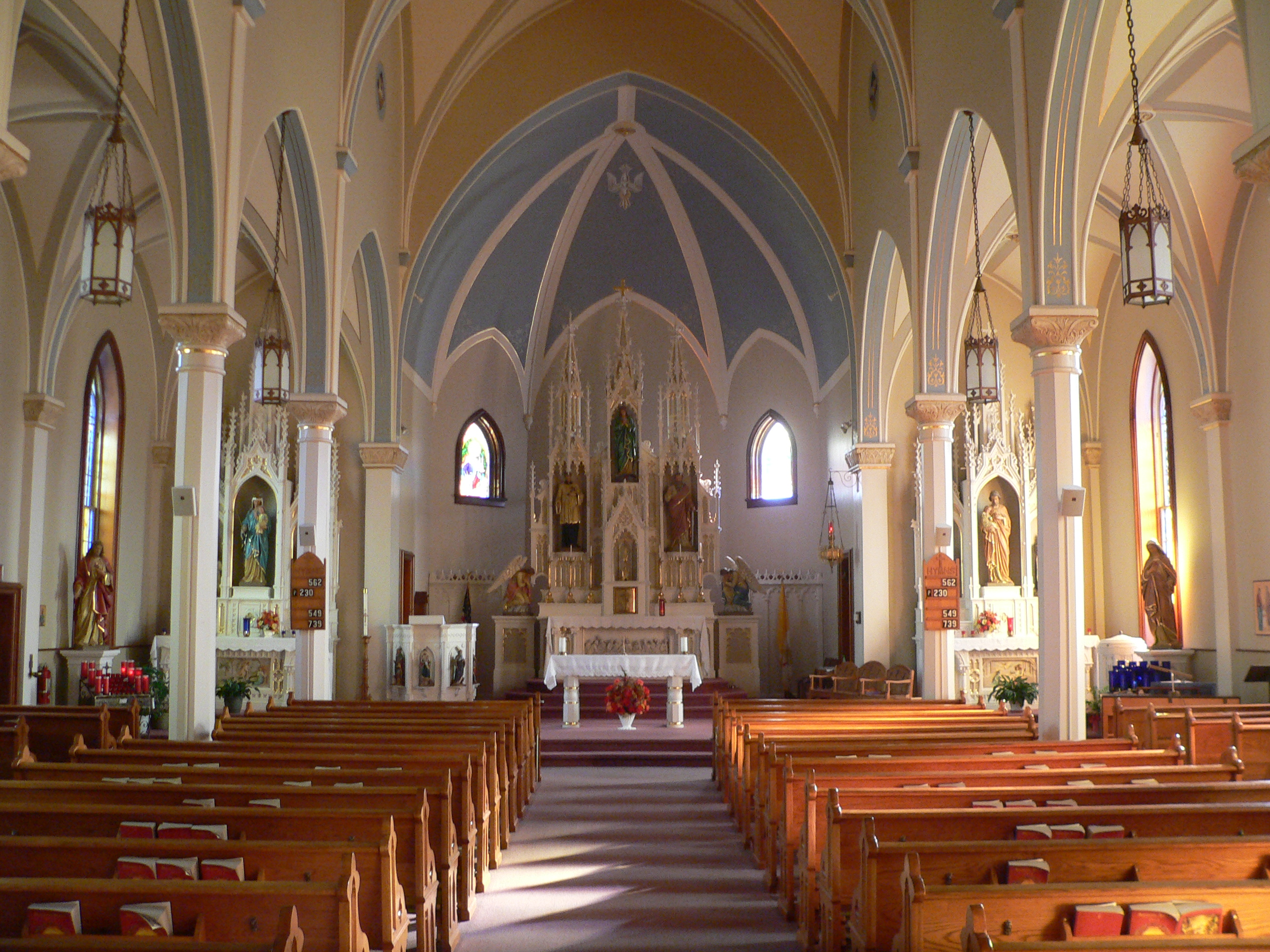

- Location within Nebraska Location within the United States
- Location: 102 and 108 E 9th St., St. Helena, Nebraska
- Coordinates: 42.809167°N 97.247778°W
- Area: less than one acre
- Built: 1897
- Built by: Stuckenhoff, Heinrich
- Architect: Schwartz, Josef
- Architectural style: Gothic Revival
- NRHP reference No.: 01000711
- Added to NRHP: July 5, 2001

The Immaculate Conception Catholic Church and Rectory in St. Helena, Nebraska was listed on the National Register of Historic Places in 2001.

The Gothic Revival church was built during 1896–1897. It was designed by architect Josef Schwartz, who also designed the similar-looking Ss. Peter and Paul Catholic Church about 10 miles (16 km) away in Bow Valley, Nebraska.

The rectory was built in 1919 and is a two-and-a-half-story Four Square house.

The town of St. Helena had population of 87 in the 1990 census.
