= Nebraska Highway 12 =

State highway in Nebraska, U.S.

State Highway 12
- Outlaw Trail Scenic Byway
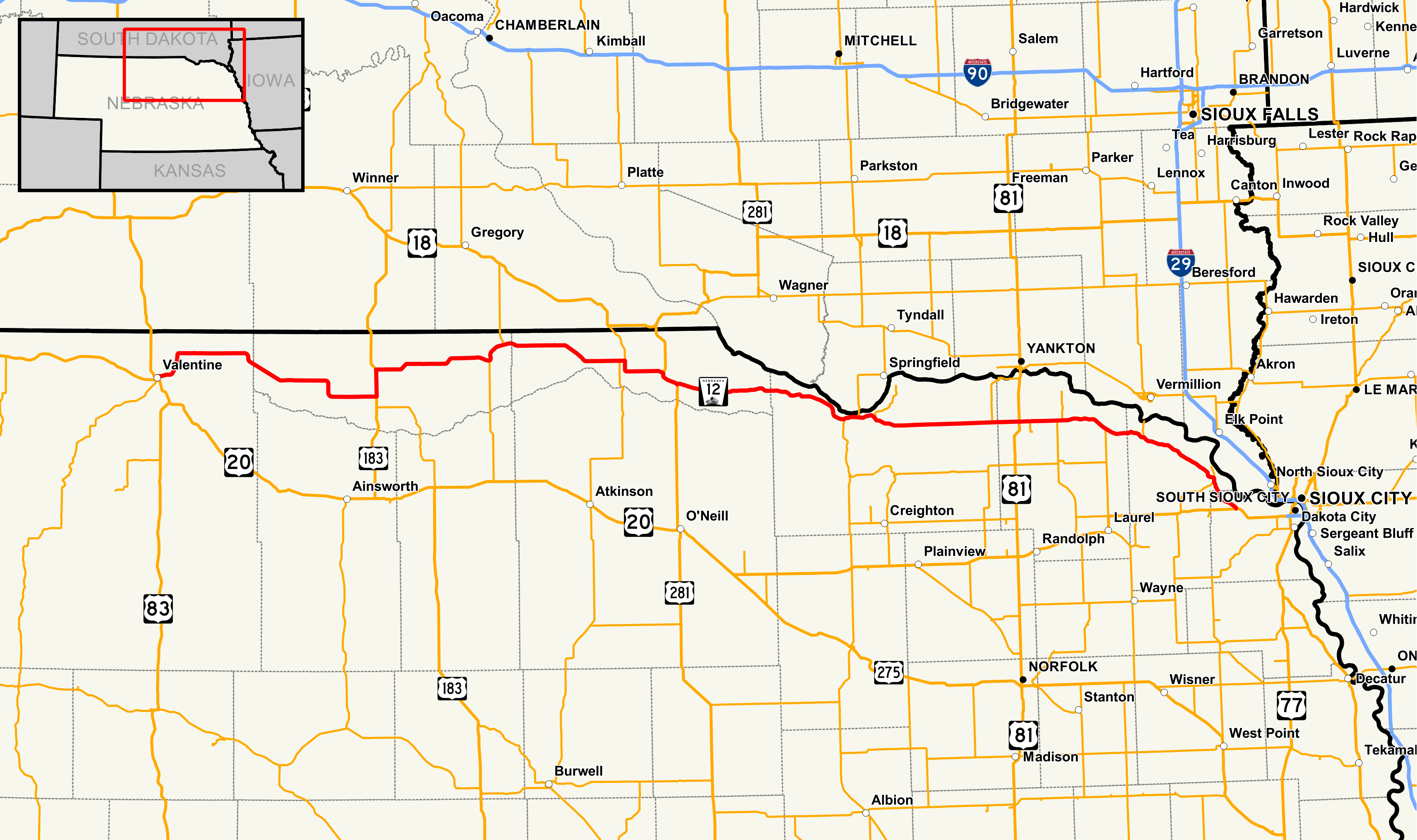
- Nebraska Highway 12 highlighted in red

Route information
- Maintained by NDOT
- Length: 231.26 mi (372.18 km)
- Existed: 1926–present

Major junctions
- West end: US 83 in Valentine
- US 183 in Springview; N-137 west of Naper; US 281 in Spencer; N-14 in Niobrara; US 81 east of Crofton; N-15 west of Obert
- East end: US 20 west of Jackson

Location
- Country: United States
- State: Nebraska
- Counties: Cherry, Keya Paha, Boyd, Knox, Cedar, Dixon, Dakota

Highway system
- Nebraska State Highway System; Interstate; US; State; Link; Spur; State Spurs; Recreation
← N-11	→ N-13

Nebraska Highway 12 is a highway in northern and northeastern Nebraska. It has a western terminus at U.S. Highway 83 in Valentine and an eastern terminus at U.S. Highway 20 west of Jackson. The highway largely lies within 10 miles (16 km) of the South Dakota border its entire length. The highway has been designated the Outlaw Trail Scenic Byway.

== Route description ==
Nebraska Highway 12 begins at an intersection with US 83 in Valentine, Nebraska. It goes northeast out of Valentine through the Fort Niobrara National Wildlife Refuge before turning east. It also provides the easiest link to Smith Falls State Park. It passes through Sparks, then turns southeasterly towards Springview, where it meets U.S. Highway 183. After a brief concurrency with US 183 north, it turns east and briefly overlaps Nebraska Highway 137 before continuing eastward to another concurrency with Nebraska Highway 11 in Butte. It goes south out of Butte, then turns east and meets U.S. Highway 281 in Spencer, which it also overlaps. It continues eastward through the tribal lands of the Ponca Tribe of Nebraska and around the edge of Niobrara State Park. It then crosses the Niobrara River and enters the village of Niobrara, Nebraska, where it meets Nebraska Highway 14.

NE 12 and NE 14 continue eastward together from Niobrara until NE 14 turns north to go across into South Dakota. NE 12 continues east through the Santee Indian Reservation and continues due east through Crofton, Nebraska. It continues on the same line eastward, intersecting U.S. Highway 81 in the process, then turns southeastward near Wynot. It meets Nebraska Highway 15 and the two routes are paired together through Obert and Maskell before NE 15 turns north to go toward Vermillion, South Dakota. It angles through Newcastle and Ponca. It turns briefly south, then goes southeast to end west of Jackson at an intersection with U.S. Highway 20.

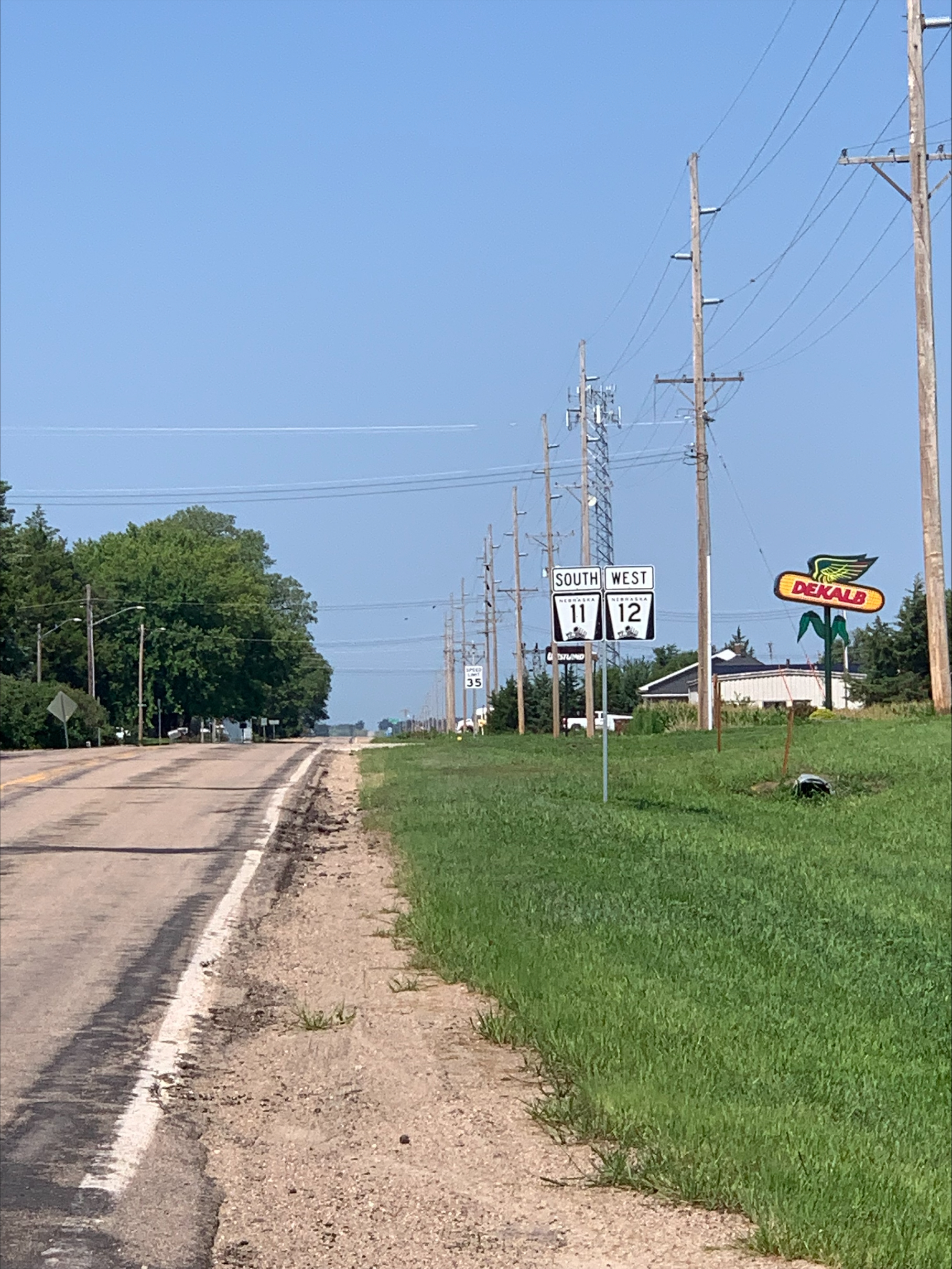
Duplex carrying Nebraska Highways 11 and 12 westbound out of Butte, Nebraska

== Major intersections ==
County	Location	mi	km	Destinations	Notes
Cherry	Valentine	0.00	0.00	US 83 (Blue Star Memorial Highway)	Western terminus; road continues south as US 83 (Main Street)
Cherry	Fort Niobrara NWR	4.13	6.65	S-16A east	
Keya Paha	Springview	48.31	77.75	US 183 south (11th Street)	Western end of US 183 overlap
Keya Paha		53.31	85.79	US 183 north	Eastern end of US 183 overlap
Keya Paha		75.41	121.36	N-137 south	Western end of N-137 overlap
Keya Paha		79.90	128.59	N-137 north	Eastern end of N-137 overlap
Boyd	Naper	89.47	143.99	S-8A north (County Road V)	
Boyd	Butte	102.53	165.01	N-11 south	Western end of N-11 overlap
Boyd	Butte	103.53	166.62	N-11 north / Lewis and Clark Trail	Eastern end of N-11 overlap
Boyd	Spencer	112.60	181.21	US 281 north	Western end of US 281 overlap
Boyd		116.19	186.99	US 281 south	Eastern end of US 281 overlap
Knox	Niobrara	150.24	241.79	N-14 south (Cedar Street)	Western end of N-14 overlap
Knox	Niobrara	153.10	246.39	N-14 north	Eastern end of N-14 overlap
Knox	Santee	156.13	251.27	S-54D north	
Knox	Crofton	178.41	287.12	N-121 north (8th Street)	
Cedar		183.39	295.14	US 81 – Yankton SD, Norfolk	
Cedar	Fordyce	185.43	298.42	S-14A south (558th Avenue)	
Cedar		190.43	306.47	N-57 south	
Cedar	St. Helena	191.43	308.08	S-14H north (564 Avenue)	
Cedar	Wynot	195.65	314.87	S-14B north	
Cedar		200.11	322.05	N-15 south (572 Avenue)	Western end of N-15 overlap
Dixon		207.82	334.45	N-15 north (579 Avenue)	Eastern end of N-15 overlap
Dixon	Ponca	223.49	359.67	S-26E north (Nebraska Street)	
Dixon	Ponca	224.47	361.25	N-9 south	
Dakota	Willis	231.26	372.18	US 20 / Lewis and Clark Trail – Sioux City, O'Neill	Eastern terminus
1.000 mi = 1.609 km; 1.000 km = 0.621 mi: Concurrency terminus
