= Nebraska Highway 7 =

State highway in Nebraska, U.S.

State Highway 7

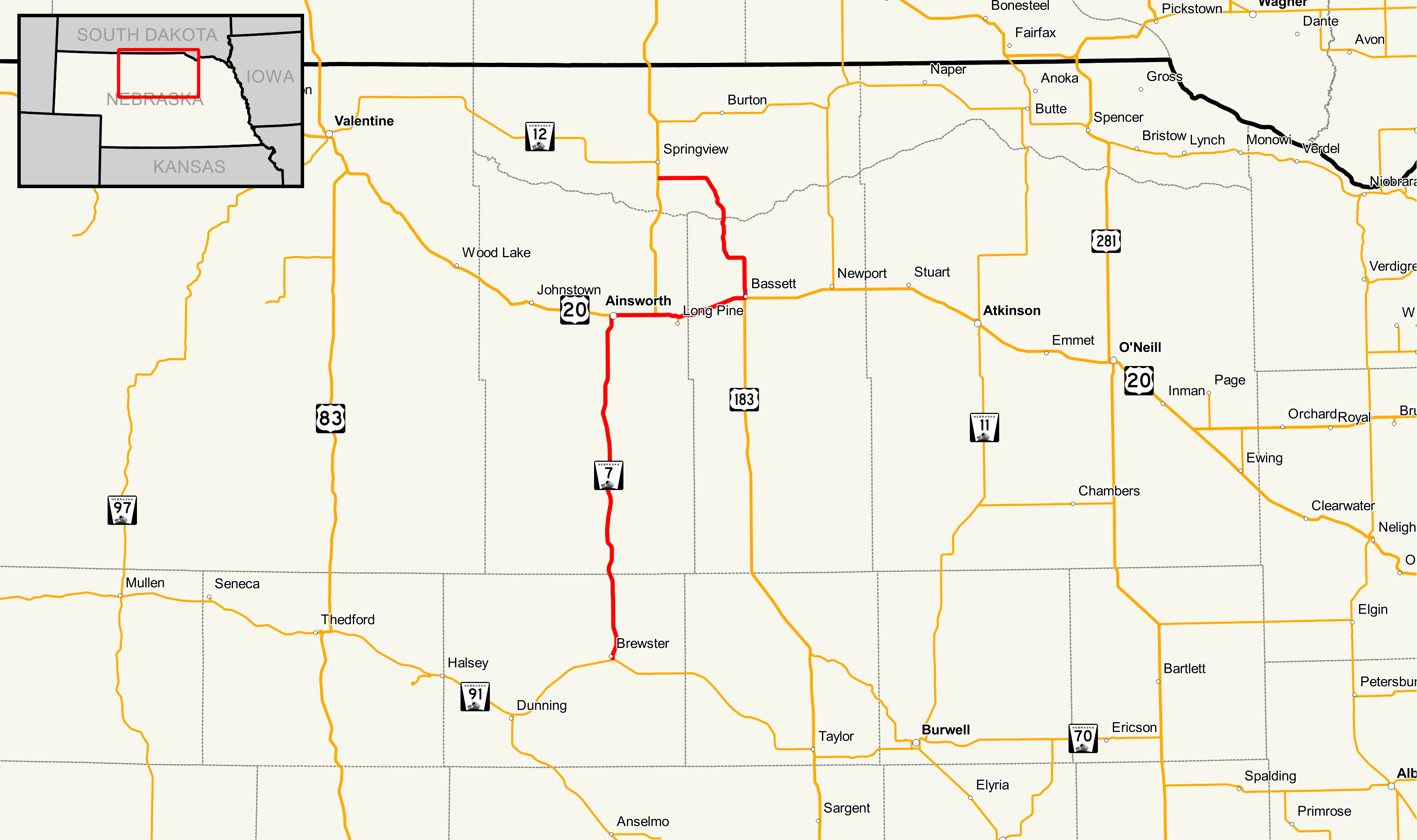
- Nebraska Highway 7 highlighted in red

Route information
- Maintained by NDOT
- Length: 66.54 mi (107.09 km)

Major junctions
- South end: N-91 in Brewster
- US 20 in Ainsworth
- North end: US 183 south of Springview

Location
- Country: United States
- State: Nebraska
- Counties: Blaine, Brown, Rock, Keya Paha

Highway system
- Nebraska State Highway System; Interstate; US; State; Link; Spur; State Spurs; Recreation
← US 6	→ N-8

Nebraska Highway 7 is a highway in Nebraska. Its southern terminus is at Nebraska Highway 91 in Brewster. Its northern terminus is at U.S. Highway 183 near Springview.

== Route description ==
Nebraska Highway 7 goes north out of Brewster and heads north through the Sand Hills until it meets U.S. Highway 20 in Ainsworth. It goes east with US 20 into farmland from Ainsworth, and meets U.S. Highway 183 between Ainsworth and Long Pine. The three highways overlap until Bassett, where NE 7 turns north. NE 7 follows a route which goes alternately north and west past the Niobrara River and ends at US 183 south of Springview.

The segment of highway it shares with US 183 and US 20 is a wrong-way concurrency, as while US 20 is going east, NE 7 is going north and US 183 is going south. Also, the segment of NE 7 between Bassett and Springview is a former segment of US 183. Previously Highway 7 went north from Ainsworth, crossing the Niobrara River at Meadville then continuing north to Highway 12. Signage in Ainsworth calls the road both "Old Highway 7" and "Meadville Road". One old concrete highway marker is still in place fourteen miles north of Ainsworth.

== Major intersections ==
County	Location	mi	km	Destinations	Notes
Blaine	Brewster	0.00	0.00	N-91 – Dunning, Taylor	
Brown	Ainsworth	43.60	70.17	US 20 west (West 4th Street) – Valentine	South end of US 20 overlap
Brown	Long Pine	49.07	78.97	US 20 east – Bassett	North end of US 20 overlap
Keya Paha		66.54	107.09	US 183 – Springview, Ainsworth	
1.000 mi = 1.609 km; 1.000 km = 0.621 mi: Concurrency terminus
