= Haughin Creek =

Stream in Nebraska, U.S.

Haughin Creek Tributary to Big Anne Creek
- Location of Haughin Creek mouth Haughin Creek (the United States)

Location
- Country: United States
- State: Nebraska
- County: Keya Paha

Physical characteristics
- Source: Coon Creek divide
  - location: about 7 miles southeast of Bothwell School
  - coordinates: 42°49′29.00″N 099°22′25.00″W
  - elevation: 2,080 ft (630 m)
- Mouth: Big Anne Creek
  - location: about 3 miles north of Mariaville, Nebraska
  - coordinates: 42°47′28.00″N 099°20′17.38″W
  - elevation: 1,818 ft (554 m)
- Length: 3.28 mi (5.28 km)
- Basin size: 4.78 square miles (12.4 km^{2})
- Discharge
  - location: Big Anne Creek
  - average: 0.63 cu ft/s (0.018 m^{3}/s) at mouth with Big Anne Creek

Basin features
- Progression: Big Anne Creek → Niobrara River → Missouri River → Mississippi
- River system: Niobrara

Haughin Creek is a 3.28 mi (5.28 km) long second-order tributary to Big Anne Creek in Keya Paha County, Nebraska. This is the only stream of this name in the United States.

Haughin Creek rises on the Coon Creek divide at about 7 miles (11 km) southeast of Bothwell School in Keya Paha County and then flows generally southeast to join Big Anne Creek about 3 miles (4.8 km) north of Mariaville, Nebraska.

== Watershed ==
Haughin Creek drains 4.78 square miles (12.4 km^{2}) of area, receives about 23.8 in/year (60 cm/year) of precipitation, and is about 3.90% forested.

== See also ==
- List of rivers of Nebraska
