= Big Anne Creek =

Stream in Nebraska, U.S.

Big Anne Creek Tributary to Niobrara River
- Location of Big Anne Creek mouth Big Anne Creek (the United States)

Location
- Country: United States
- State: Nebraska
- County: Keya Paha

Physical characteristics
- Source: Coon Creek divide
  - location: about 6 miles southeast of Bothwell School
  - coordinates: 42°49′16.29″N 099°24′8.69″W
  - elevation: 2,084 ft (635 m)
- Mouth: Niobrara River
  - location: about 2 miles northeast of Mariaville, Nebraska
  - coordinates: 42°47′37.34″N 099°18′46.99″W
  - elevation: 1,788 ft (545 m)
- Length: 10.79 mi (17.36 km)
- Basin size: 20.65 square miles (53.5 km^{2})
- Discharge
  - location: Niobrara River
  - average: 2.38 cu ft/s (0.067 m^{3}/s) at mouth with Niobrara River

Basin features
- Progression: Niobrara River → Missouri River → Mississippi
- River system: Niobrara
- Tributaries
  - left: Haughin Creek
- Bridges: Hay Valley Road, Big Anne Lane, Haugen Creek Road, NE 137

Big Anne Creek is a 10.79 mi (17.36 km) long third-order tributary to the Niobrara River in Keya Paha County, Nebraska. This is the only stream of this name in the United States.

== Variant names ==
According to the Geographic Names Information System, it has also been known historically as:

- Anne Creek

Big Anne Creek rises on the Coon Creek divide at Big Anne Spring about 6 miles (9.7 km) southeast of Bothwell School in Keya Paha County and then flows southeast to join the Niobrara River about 2 miles (3.2 km) northeast of Mariaville, Nebraska.

== Watershed ==
Big Anne Creek drains 20.65 square miles (53.5 km^{2}) of area, receives about 23.6 in/year (60 cm/year) of precipitation, and is about 3.18% forested.

== See also ==
- List of rivers of Nebraska
