= St. Peter's, Nebraska =

- Abandoned community
- Location within the state of Nebraska
- Coordinates: 42°35′24″N 97°02′04″W
- Country: United States
- State: Nebraska
- County: Cedar

Population (2000)
  - Total: 0
- Time zone: UTC-6 (Central (CST))
  - Summer (DST): UTC-5 (CDT)
- Area code: 402

St. Peter's was located less than a mile from the Dixon County, NE line, in Section 12 of present-day Precinct 14 of Cedar County, about 12 miles east and 1.5 miles south of Hartington.

== History ==
St. Peter's was named in honor of Johann Peter Abts, the first settler and postmaster in the area. It was located nearby land owned by the Chandler, Lyman, O'Flaherty, and Templeman families, early settlers of the area. It was called a “community” and was said to have a hotel, store and post office combined in one building. St. Peter's was labeled as a “trading post and stage house” located along the old “Territorial Military and Post Road,” also known as the “Pacific Wagon Road,” surveyed in 1857. Further northwest, another portion of the Territorial Road is identified on the west side of present-day Highway 15 in Section 29 of Precinct 7. The road ran from present-day Plattsmouth, NE via St Peter's and near St. James, to Niobrara, NE. The St. Peter's trading post and stage house was torn down a few years before the 1967 Nebraska Centennial.

St. Peter's School (District 12) was organized in 1875 and the schoolhouse was built in 1878 along a tributary of the East Bow Creek near the trading post and stage house. The school was washed away by an 1891 flood, was rebuilt at that location, then moved one-half mile north and one-half mile west. District 12 was dissolved and merged with the Hartington and Laurel Districts in 1970. St. Peter's post office, established May 21, 1875, with Mr. Abts as postmaster, was discontinued January 18, 1902. It was located just south of the school in 1885. The Abts homestead was located about four miles west and one mile north of St. Peter's.
