= Jamison, Nebraska =

Unincorporated community in Nebraska, United States

- Unincorporated community
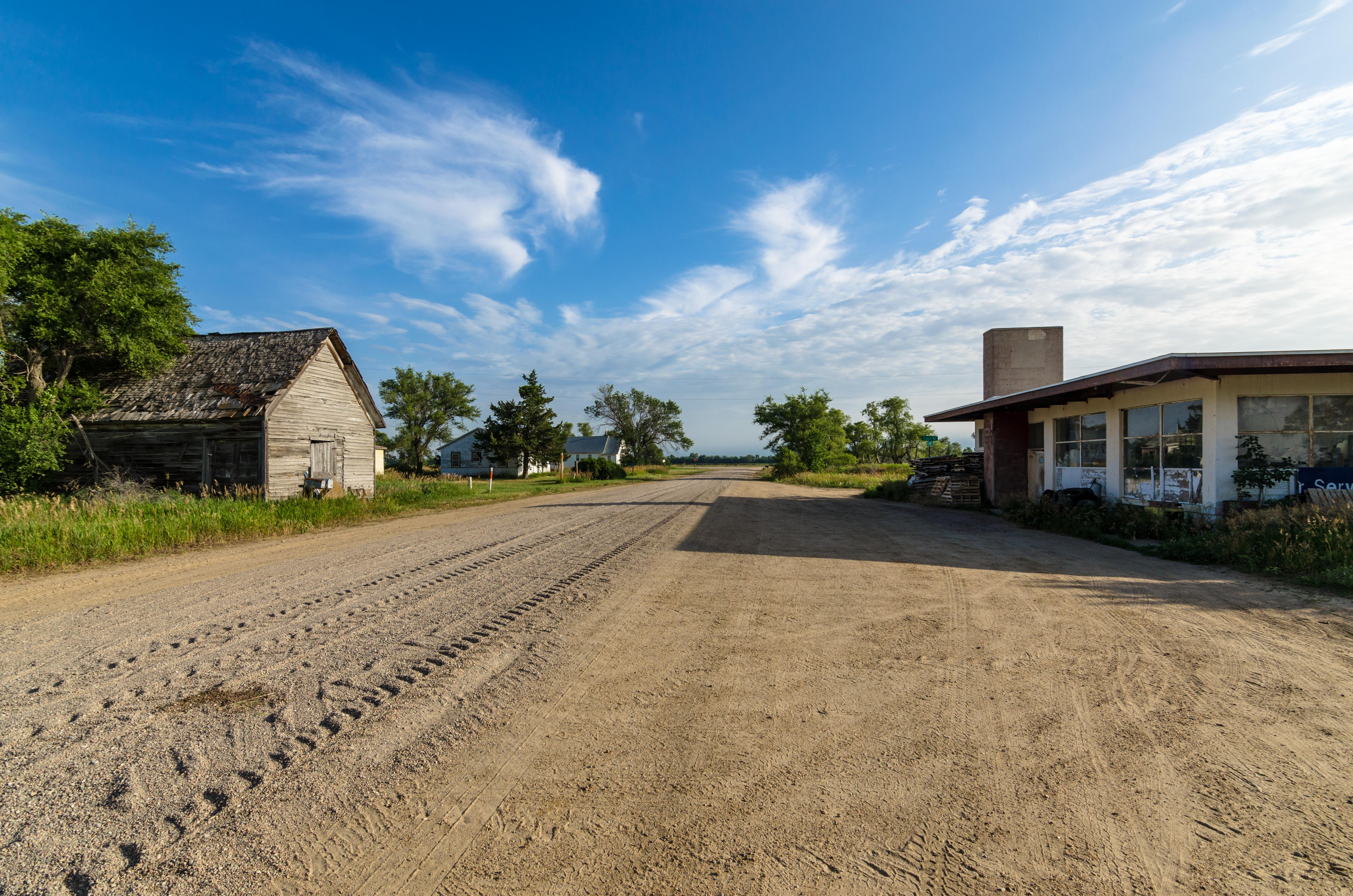
- Main Street in Jamison

- Location within the state of Nebraska
- Coordinates: 42°59′52″N 99°18′28″W
- Country: United States
- State: Nebraska
- County: Keya Paha
- Elevation: 2,231 ft (680 m)
- Time zone: UTC-6 (Central (CST))
  - Summer (DST): UTC-5 (CDT)
- ZIP code: 68778
- FIPS code: 31-24460
- GNIS feature ID: 830341

Jamison is an unincorporated community in Keya Paha County, Nebraska, United States. It lies in the northeastern corner of Keya Paha County, just south of the South Dakota state line.

== History ==
Jamison was founded by S. P. Jamison, and named for him.

A post office was established at Jamison in 1903, and remained in operation until it was discontinued in 1972.
