= Obert, Nebraska =

- Village
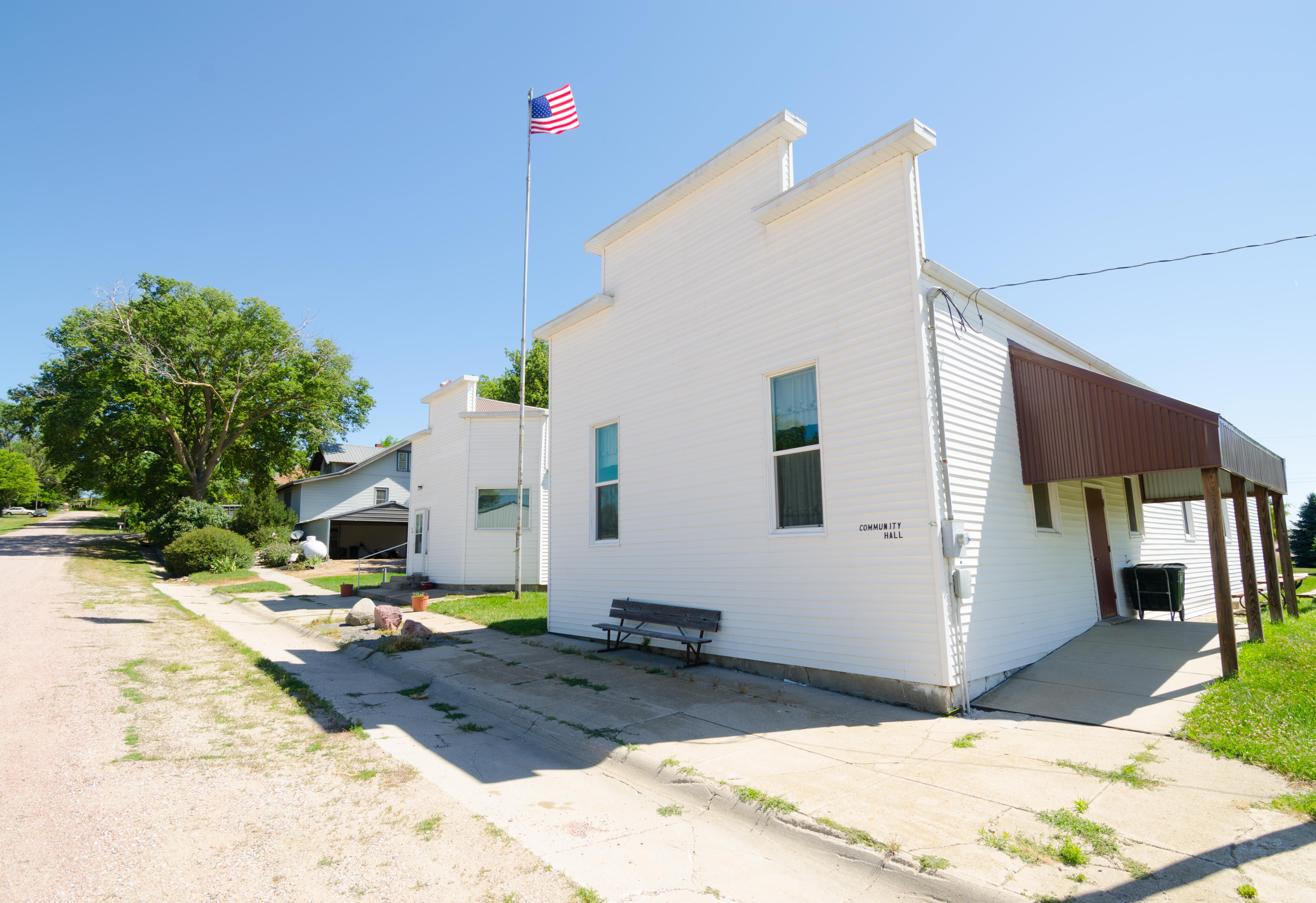
- Obert City Hall and Community Center

- Location of Obert, Nebraska
- Coordinates: 42°41′22″N 97°01′38″W
- Country: United States
- State: Nebraska
- County: Cedar

Area
  - Total: 0.073 sq mi (0.19 km^{2})
  - Land: 0.073 sq mi (0.19 km^{2})
  - Water: 0 sq mi (0.00 km^{2})
- Elevation: 1,348 ft (411 m)

Population (2020)
  - Total: 23
  - Estimate (2021): 23
  - Density: 310/sq mi (120/km^{2})
- Time zone: UTC-6 (Central (CST))
  - Summer (DST): UTC-5 (CDT)
- ZIP code: 68757
- Area codes: 402 and 531
- FIPS code: 31-35560
- GNIS feature ID: 2399551

Obert is a village in Cedar County, Nebraska, United States. The population was 23 at the 2020 census.

== History ==
Obert was established in 1907 when the Chicago, St. Paul, Minneapolis and Omaha Railway was extended to that point. It was named for a railroad official. Originally, Obert was named Oberton, but there was confusion between the villages of Oberton and Overton, Nebraska regarding the mail. Oberton was therefore shortened to Obert.

== Geography ==
According to the United States Census Bureau, the village has a total area of 0.07 square miles (0.18 km^{2}), all land.

Nebraska State Highways 12 and 15 serve the community.

== Demographics ==
Historical population
Census	Pop.	Note	%±
1920	116		—
1930	112		−3.4%
1940	112		0.0%
1950	91		−18.7%
1960	42		−53.8%
1970	36		−14.3%
1980	44		22.2%
1990	39		−11.4%
2000	49		25.6%
2010	23		−53.1%
2020	22		−4.3%
U.S. Decennial Census

=== 2010 census ===
As of the census of 2010, there were 23 people, 12 households, and 10 families living in the village. The population density was 328.6 inhabitants per square mile (126.9/km^{2}). There were 16 housing units at an average density of 228.6 per square mile (88.3/km^{2}). The racial makeup of the village was 100.0% White.

There were 12 households, of which 8.3% had children under the age of 18 living with them, 75.0% were married couples living together, 8.3% had a female householder with no husband present, and 16.7% were non-families. 16.7% of all households were made up of individuals, and 8.3% had someone living alone who was 65 years of age or older. The average household size was 1.92 and the average family size was 2.10.

The median age in the village was 52.3 years. 4.3% of residents were under the age of 18; 4.3% were between the ages of 18 and 24; 13% were from 25 to 44; 39% were from 45 to 64; and 39.1% were 65 years of age or older. The gender makeup of the village was 47.8% male and 52.2% female.

=== 2000 census ===
As of the census of 2000, there were 49 people, 17 households, and 15 families living in the village. The population density was 658.3 inhabitants per square mile (254.2/km^{2}). There were 18 housing units at an average density of 241.8 per square mile (93.4/km^{2}). The racial makeup of the village was 100.00% White.

There were 17 households, out of which 35.3% had children under the age of 18 living with them, 94.1% were married couples living together, and 5.9% were non-families. 5.9% of all households were made up of individuals, and none had someone living alone who was 65 years of age or older. The average household size was 2.88 and the average family size was 3.00.

In the village, the population was spread out, with 32.7% under the age of 18, 28.6% from 25 to 44, 26.5% from 45 to 64, and 12.2% who were 65 years of age or older. The median age was 38 years. For every 100 females, there were 113.0 males. For every 100 females age 18 and over, there were 106.3 males.

As of 2000 the median income for a household in the village was $33,125, and the median income for a family was $33,125. Males had a median income of $24,750 versus $12,188 for females. The per capita income for the village was $29,645. None of the population and none of the families were below the poverty line.
