= Saints Philip and James Parochial School =

- U.S. National Register of Historic Places
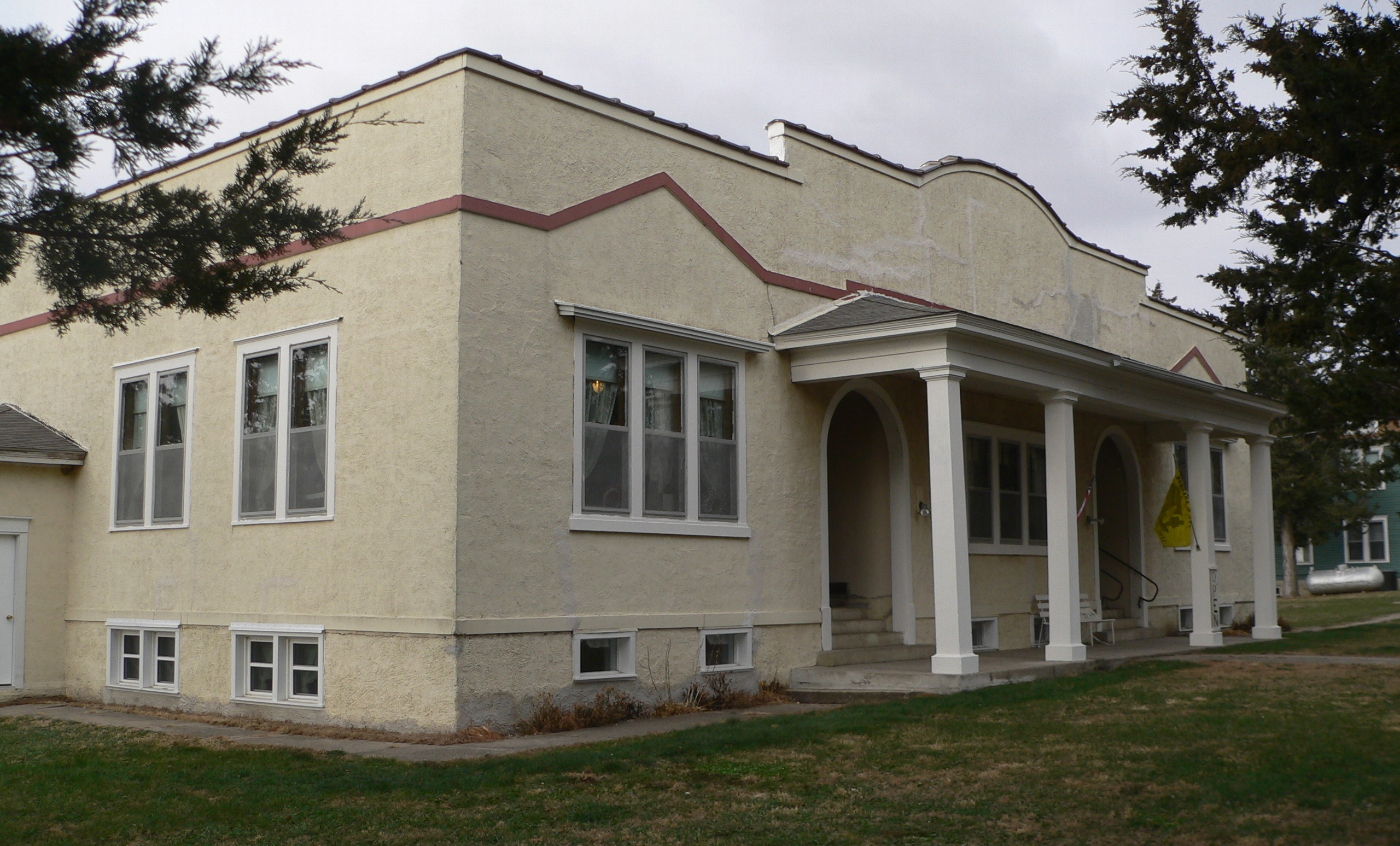

- Location within Nebraska Location within the United States
- Location: 89039 570 Ave., Wynot, Nebraska
- Coordinates: 42°44′3″N 97°8′37″W
- Area: 2.2 acres (0.89 ha)
- Built: 1919
- Built by: Henry Stuckenhoff
- Architectural style: Mission/Spanish Revival
- NRHP reference No.: 03001211
- Added to NRHP: November 26, 2003

The Saints Philip and James Parochial School in St. James, Nebraska, 1.5 miles ESE of Wynot, Nebraska, United States, also known as St. James Marketplace, is a one-story stuccoed building built in 1919. It was listed on the National Register of Historic Places in 2003.

It was designed and built by local contractor Henry Stuckenhoff. It is a rare Mission Revival style building for northeast Nebraska.
