= St. Boniface Catholic Church Complex =

Historic church in Nebraska, United States

- U.S. National Register of Historic Places
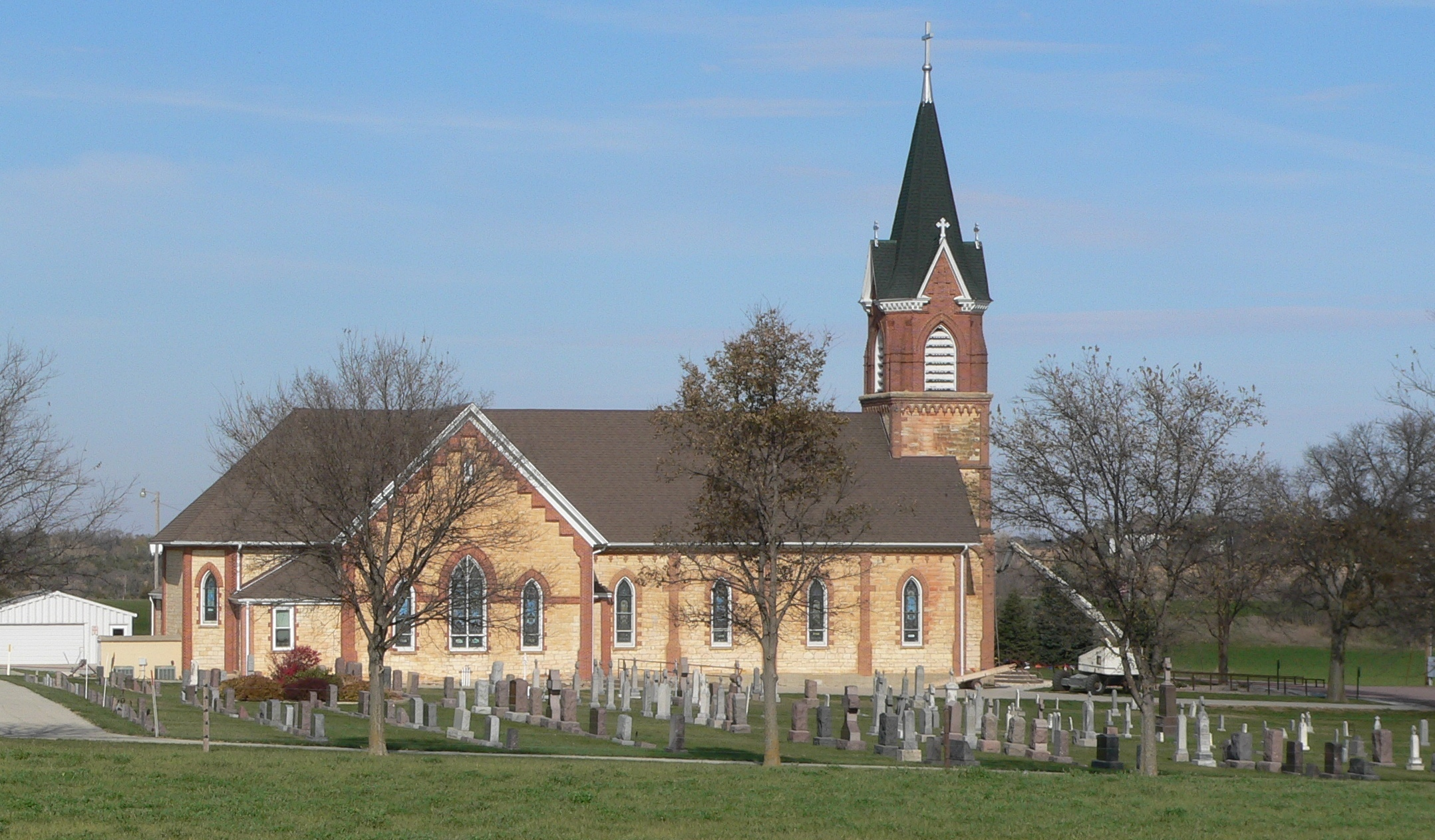

- Location within Nebraska Location within the United States
- Location: Main St., Menominee, Nebraska
- Coordinates: 42.786111°N 97.373611°W
- Area: 16 acres (6.5 ha)
- Built: 1886; 1900–02; 1911; 1923; 1977–78
- Architectural style: Gothic Revival, Second Renaissance Revival
- NRHP reference No.: 83001081
- Added to NRHP: July 21, 1983

The St. Boniface Catholic Church Complex in Menominee, Nebraska, includes six contributing buildings and a cemetery on a 16-acre (6.5 ha) plot, was added to the National Register of Historic Places in 1983.

The former parish church remains in use by the Parish of All Saints, which was formed in 2018 from the merger of the former parishes of St. Boniface, St. John the Baptist in Fordyce, and St. Joseph in Constance. The church is Gothic Revival and was built using chalk rock in 1886 and 1900–1902.

Other buildings in the complex include a rectory and school, and a contributing site (a cemetery). The rectory is brick and was built in 1911. The 2 1/2-story chalk rock school was built in 1923 in the Second Renaissance Revival style.
