= Willis, Nebraska =

- Unincorporated community
- Location within Nebraska Location within the United States
- Coordinates: 42°28′31″N 96°37′44″W
- Country: United States
- State: Nebraska
- County: Dakota
- Elevation: 1,161 ft (354 m)
- Time zone: UTC-6 (Central (CST))
  - Summer (DST): UTC-5 (CDT)
- Area code: 402
- GNIS feature ID: 835479

Willis (also Brady, Brady's Crossing, Vista) is an unincorporated community in Dakota County, Nebraska, United States. The community lies at the intersection of U.S. Route 20 and Nebraska Highway 12.
