= Franz Zavadil Farmstead =

- U.S. National Register of Historic Places
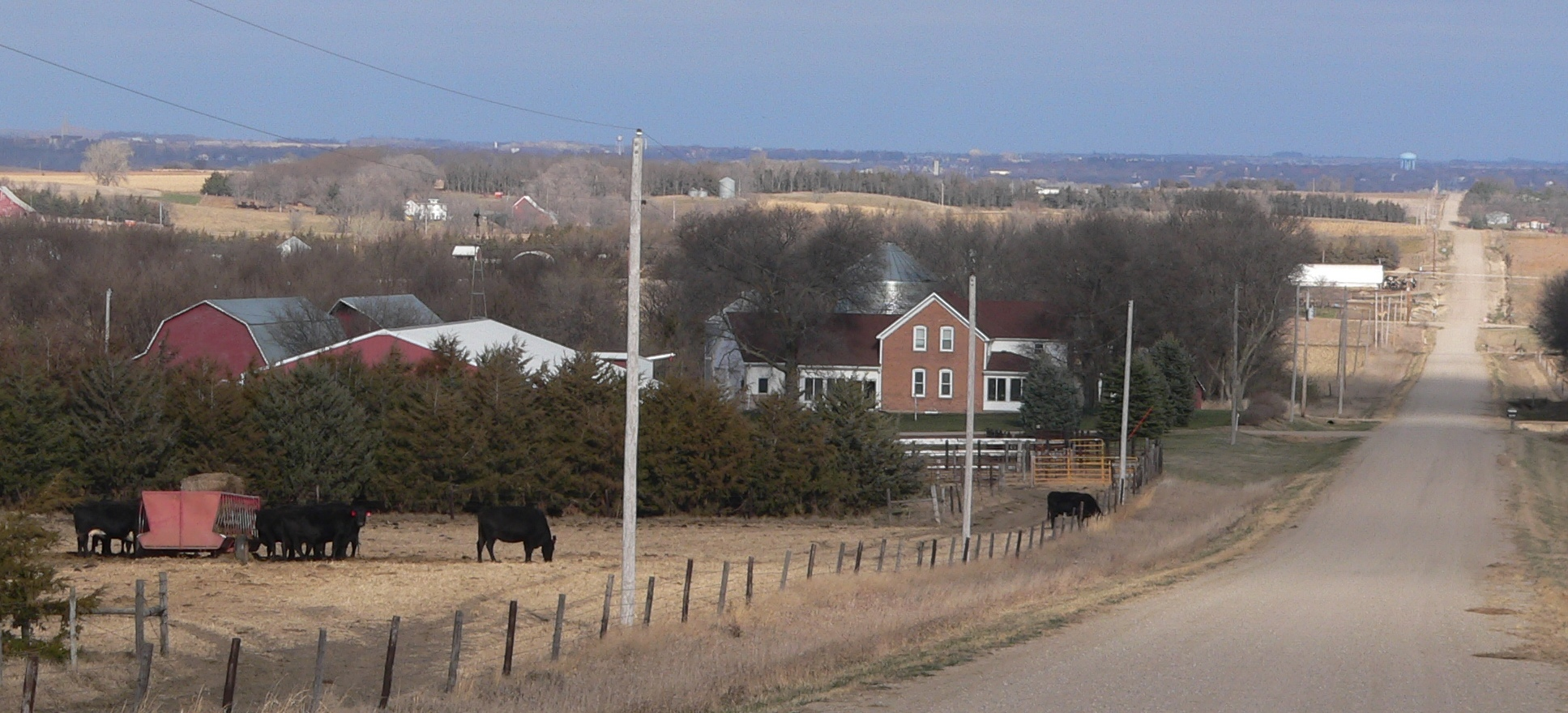
- Location: Address Restricted, Menominee, Nebraska
- Area: Over 160 acres (65 ha)
- Built: 1876
- Architect: Zavadil, Franz
- NRHP reference No.: 85000173
- Added to NRHP: January 31, 1985

The Franz Zavadil Farmstead, also known as the Zavadil Farmstead, is a house and a group of farm buildings in Menominee, Nebraska, United States. The property was obtained in 1876 by Franz Zavadil, an immigrant from Bohemia. The farmstead includes 160 acres (65 ha) of land and 19 separate structures, including two dwellings, a garage, a granary, a privy, a blacksmith's shop, barns and sheds. It was listed on the National Register of Historic Places on January 31, 1985.
