= Burton Wilkinson =

American-born English cricketer

Personal information
- Full name: Burton Wilkinson
- Born: 25 April 1900; Burton, Nebraska, United States
- Died: 16 October 1985 (aged 85); Peterborough, Northamptonshire, England
- Batting: Left-handed
- Bowling: Slow left-arm orthodox

Domestic team information
- Years: Team
- 1932: Northamptonshire

Career statistics
Competition	First-class
Matches	1
Runs scored	0
Batting average	0.00
100s/50s	–/–
Top score	0
Balls bowled	48
Wickets	1
Bowling average	22.00
5 wickets in innings	–
10 wickets in match	–
Best bowling	1/22
Catches/stumpings	1/–
- Source: Cricinfo, 17 November 2011

Burton Wilkinson (25 April 1900 – 16 October 1985) was an American born English cricketer. Wilkinson was a left-handed batsman who bowled slow left-arm orthodox. He was born at Burton, Nebraska.

Wilkinson made a single first-class appearance for Northamptonshire against Middlesex at the Town Ground, Peterborough in the 1932 County Championship. In Northamptonshire's first-innings he was dismissed for a duck by Jack Durston. He Middlesex's first-innings he claimed his only wicket of the match, that of Nigel Haig.

He died at Peterborough, Cambridgeshire on 16 October 1985.
