= Wiseman massacre =

The Wiseman massacre was an incident that led to the deaths of five children allegedly at the hands of Native Americans on the morning of July 24, 1863, in what is now Cedar County, Nebraska. The children's parents were Henson and Pheobe Wiseman. The five children who died and their ages were Arthur, 16, Hannah, 14, Andrew, 9, William "Henry", 8, and Loren, 4. The massacre occurred approximately 3 miles east-northeast of St. James, Nebraska.

== Description of the incident ==
=== The parents ===
In 1862, the children's father, Henson Wiseman, a native of what is now West Virginia, enlisted in Company I, of the 2nd Nebraska Cavalry. In the spring of 1863, the Nebraska 2nd was posted at Omadi just near present-day Dakota City. The expedition was ordered upriver along the Missouri River on horseback. This Army Expeditionary Force was under the command of General Alfred Sully. Their alleged orders were to connect with another military force moving West out of Minnesota under the direction of General Sibley. Both expeditions were to push all Dakota, regardless of involvement in the previous year's uprising along the Minnesota River. The uprising alleges the Dakota tribes burned farms and tortured and/or killed an estimated 1,000 white settlers. General Sibley, former Governor of the Minnesota Territory hastily activated the Minnesota militia. After nearly a week of the Dakota's failed attacks on Fort Ridgely and the town of New Ulm, the Dakota retreated. Many of the Dakota villagers decided to strike west into the Dakota Territory to escape the vengeance they knew was coming. Leaving their ancestral hunting grounds along the Minnesota River in what they called the Big Woods. President Lincoln ordered the Union Army General Pope to oversee the Indian trouble. Pope sent both General Sibley and Sully to push all bands of Dakota to the west side of the Missouri River. In light of the uprising that had occurred in Minnesota and with the Eastern tribes of Sioux having joined white-friendly bands in the Dakota Territory, settlers living in Nebraska's Dixon and Cedar counties expressed considerable concern to military authorities that the absence of their men would leave their families vulnerable to attack. Army authorities reassured the volunteers, they would build a fort in the vicinity and that soldiers posted at Fort Randall and near the Dakota Territorial Capital would be sufficient to patrol the south bank of the Missouri River to guard the families and their property.

The children's mother, Pheobe Cross Wiseman, left their home on July 21 to purchase supplies in the town of Yankton, DT. Pheobe went to the nearby village of St. James, approximately 3 miles from her home as the crow flies, 9 miles by road. She then rode with a man who hired out his services to take people from Ponca to Niobrara. Pheobe got let off at Elm Grove, which was across the Missouri River from Yankton. She spent the night at the George Hall residence and the next morning crossed the river to Yankton, made her purchases, and returned to Elm Grove in the evening. That night she stayed with Mrs. Amos Parker to rest for the journey back to her home. Pheobe returned to St. James with the same man who took her to Elm Grove, on their way home they were overtaken by a thunderstorm. Leaving her purchases in St James, not understanding why her son, Arthur, hadn't picked her up in St James. She insisted on walking, through the mud, home, When she approached the home, she was shocked that neither the children nor the family dog had come to greet her. When Pheobe came close to the twin log cabins, she saw books on the ground in front of her home and then noticed blood on the door latch. As she ran to the door, she tripped over the body of her 8-year-old son, William "Henry" Wiseman. When she reached the door she saw the body of an Indian in the doorway and the remnants of an obvious struggle. Frightened, thinking natives could still be around, Pheobe fled the scene and returned to St. James through bushes and muddy vales. The men of the town refused to return to the scene until the following morning.

=== The dead ===
When they arrived, they saw Henry lying in the front yard shot in the back, just as his mother had described. The men also heard groaning, but it was from two of the children who were still alive. Hannah was lying on the bed in the main cabin and had suffered from a musket black powder cartridge ignited in her mouth. She had also been tortured with arrows that penetrated her vaginal area and came out through her hips. Hannah lived five days, the longest of the two surviving children, but never spoke and slipped in and out of consciousness. Andrew lay dead on the floor next to his older brother Arthur. Arthur lay on the floor with a musket in hand. The barrel was bent and the stock shattered. Loren was found sitting on the bed with his big sister, grasping the bedpost. He had been stabbed in the lung and requested water. When asked who did this, all he could say was "The Indians scared him.". Loren lived for three days before succumbing to his injuries.

=== The perpetrators ===
Eight days prior to getting the news, Henson Wiseman encountered a Native American woman/girl wearing the shoes, of his wife Pheobe, stolen from the massacre site. It is alleged that four Santee natives were thought to be responsible, although this was never proven. Members of the Yankton Band of Dakota may also have perpetrated the tragedy. When General Sully finally decided to reveal the news of the tragedy to Henson on August 4. The expedition was camped just south of Fort Pierre, to eventually become Pierre, the capital of South Dakota. This over 240 miles north of his home, he immediately rode day and night. Sergeant John Hewitt of E Company, 6th Iowa Cavalry—then at Fort Randall with his regiment preparing for transfer upriver—recorded in his diary that a soldier of the 2nd Nebraska had passed through on his way home, where his family had been massacred, having ridden non-stop all the way. When Henson arrived, he heard that the townspeople allowed Pheobe to wander off. No one knew where she had gone. She was obviously inconsolable with grief and difficult to deal with. He finally found her 28 days after the massacre, near Ponca by a creek. He eventually removed her from the area, returning to Virginia, where they remained for nearly a year. Their only surviving child, 18-year-old John Wiseman, then in the Union Army fighting Confederates. Pheobe was three months pregnant at the time she discovered her five children's attack. A baby boy, Richard, was born March 8, 1864. He was handicapped and never able to use his legs, on possible account of Pheobe taking laudanum, which she was given for her grief. Pheobe and Henson had one more child, three years later. She would become Laura Wiseman Lawson. It is said that Henson vowed to kill every "Indian" he saw. He was suspected of tracking and killing Native Americans up and down the river. According to one Cedar County version, Wiseman sometimes perched himself along the bluffs overlooking the river, where he would randomly shoot Native Americans traversing the river in canoes with a Sharp rifled musket. Many empty canoes washed up on the banks of the Missouri River. Henson Wiseman lived to the age of 94 and died on February 19, 1912.
