= St. James, Nebraska =

- Unincorporated village
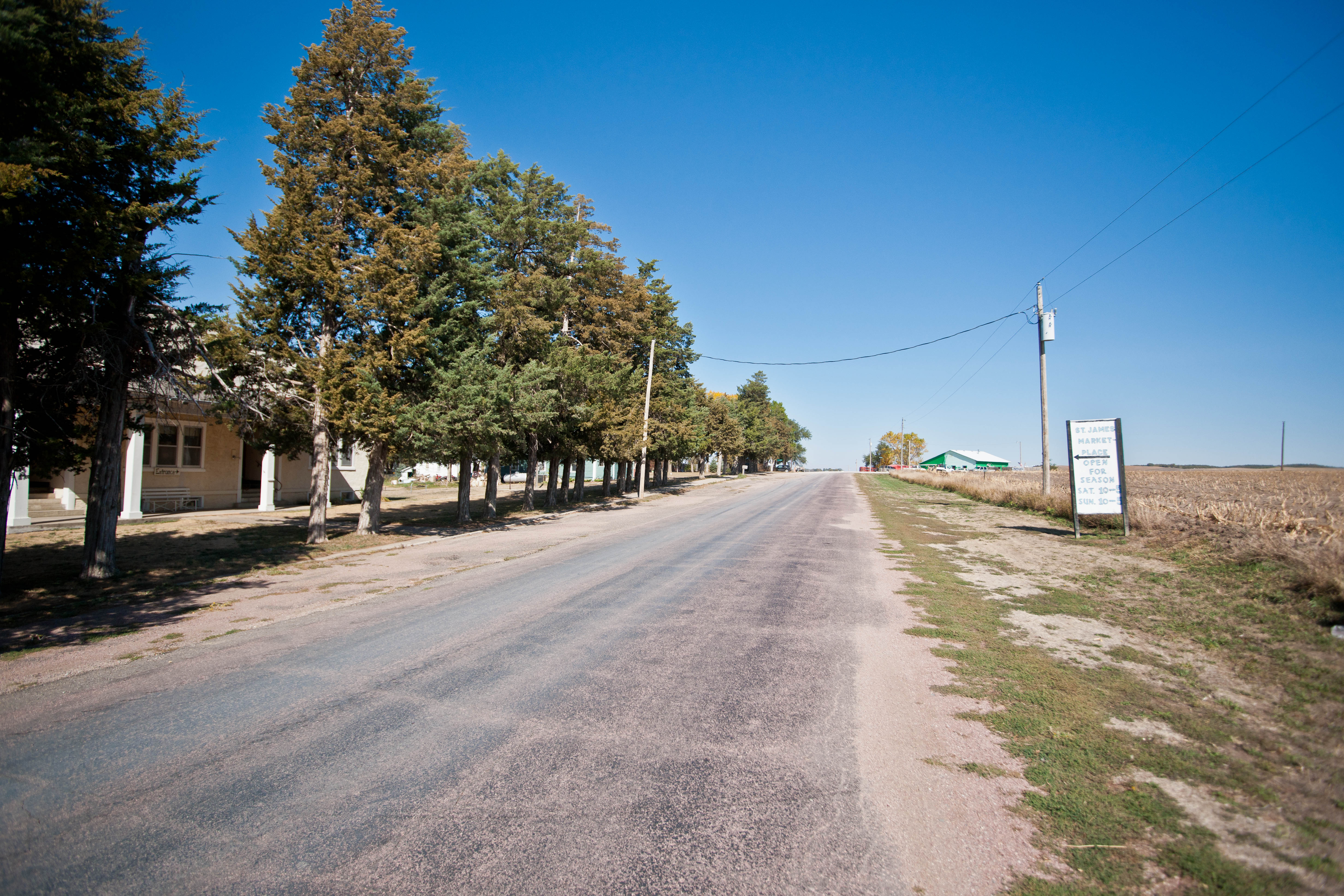
- A Street in St. James

- Location within the state of Nebraska
- Coordinates: 42°44′07″N 97°08′36″W
- Country: United States
- State: Nebraska
- County: Cedar

Population (2010)
  - Total: est. 12
- Time zone: UTC-6 (Central (CST))
  - Summer (DST): UTC-5 (CDT)
- Area code: 402

St. James, an unincorporated community in Cedar County, Nebraska, United States, was first settled in 1856 and served as the first county seat of Cedar County. St. James, however, claims two former locations. The first was at the confluence of Bow Creek and the Missouri River. The second (Old St. James) covered ~67 acres 1.5 miles south of its original location and 0.6 miles northwest of today's location. Today’s St. James includes the St. James Marketplace (formerly Saints Philip and James Parochial School), the Catholic cemetery, a bar/restaurant, and several homes (one which was the former Catholic rectory).

== Old St. James ==
Old St. James (its second location) was at the intersection of 569 Avenue and 891 Road in Cedar County. However, its origin dates back to St. James Landing at the confluence of the Missouri River and Petite Arc Creek, the French fur traders’ name for Little Bow Creek, now called the Main Bow Creek. Colonel Charles C. Van, Moses H. Deming, Hadley D. Johnson and Marshall Townsley incorporated the St. James-Minnesota Ferry Co. on February 10, 1857 to provide transport from there across the Missouri River to what was then Minnesota Territory. Called St. James, a claim had been staked at the Landing in 1856 by Van and Deming, formerly of Des Moines, IA. The first habitation there was a cavern named the "Arcade" dug into a hillside. The original St. James was platted by the St. James Co. by July 1857, occupying the eastern and western halves of Sections 11 and 12, resp., in Township 32N Range 2E, with Deming as president. Townsley, a shareholder, sold part of his interest to Gates P. Thurston, who arrived from Dayton, Ohio in the spring of 1857 and is credited with laying out the original townsite with hopes of its eventually becoming Nebraska's state capital. Thurston, who became Cedar County’s 1st Judge, built a 1-1/2 story log building, intended to be a courthouse, near this site. Though the original St. James was named Cedar County Seat when the county was organized by the Territorial Legislature on February 12, 1857, the courthouse was never used for its intended purpose. Instead it was used for religious services, meetings and as a fortress against Indian scares. By 1860 St. James had a population of 50 which, according to that year's federal census, included a merchant, carpenter, blacksmith, engineer, mechanic, minister, and lawyer as head of household. However, when a new flour mill was built in the mid-1860s about 1.5 miles upstream on Bow Creek, the original St. James Landing townsite moved to the mill's location and what is now called Old St. James began to grow rapidly. Eventually Old St. James had the mill plus two hotels, a drug store, two merchandise stores, a saloon, two banks, a lumber store, two hardware stores, a blacksmith shop, two churches and a school.

Henson Wiseman, among the St. James area's first permanent settlers, arrived there in 1857. Five Wiseman children were massacred by Native Americans near St. James July 24, 1863. Other 1857 area settlers were James Hay, O.D. Smith, Saby Strahm, John Andres, John McCoubray, a Mr. Wadsworth, and Henry, Ernest, Gustav and Herman Ferber, and their father, Paul Ferber. St. James Post Office, established July 13, 1858, was initially located in the pocket of whoever was postmaster at the time but soon was situated in Old St. James. It was discontinued May 31, 1909 when service began from nearby Wynot. Private education in the St. James area started in 1861 and the first public school in Cedar County, called St. James School, was built in 1867 ~2 miles north-northwest of Old Saint James, near the Jones “Bow Valley” Mills. School District 1 was formally organized there April 30, 1873 and closed January 2, 1953. Later, District 10 also provided public and parochial education in the area.

An 1869 vote that moved the county seat to St. Helena and a failed attempt in 1876 for rail service curtailed Old St. James' growth. Thus its population, 81 in 1880, peaked at about 100 inhabitants in 1882. A 2nd attempt for rail service to Old St. James occurred in 1906 when the Chicago, St. Paul, Minneapolis and Omaha Railroad was asked to extend its line from nearby Newcastle. But the rail terminus was built across Bow Creek, one mile west of Old St. James, resulting in the new town of Wynot. Soon Old St. James’ businesses, its churches and people moved to Wynot. Old St. James today consists of a farmplace and several residential lots. One mile southeast of Old St. James are the SS Philip and James Catholic Cemetery, St. James Marketplace, a business, and several homes. Many people from Old St. James are buried in the former St. James public cemetery, now called the Wynot Public Cemetery, located ¾ mile west-southwest of Old St. James on a hill just south of Wynot.
