= Saints Peter and Paul Catholic Church Complex (Bow Valley, Nebraska) =

Historic church in Nebraska, United States

- U.S. National Register of Historic Places
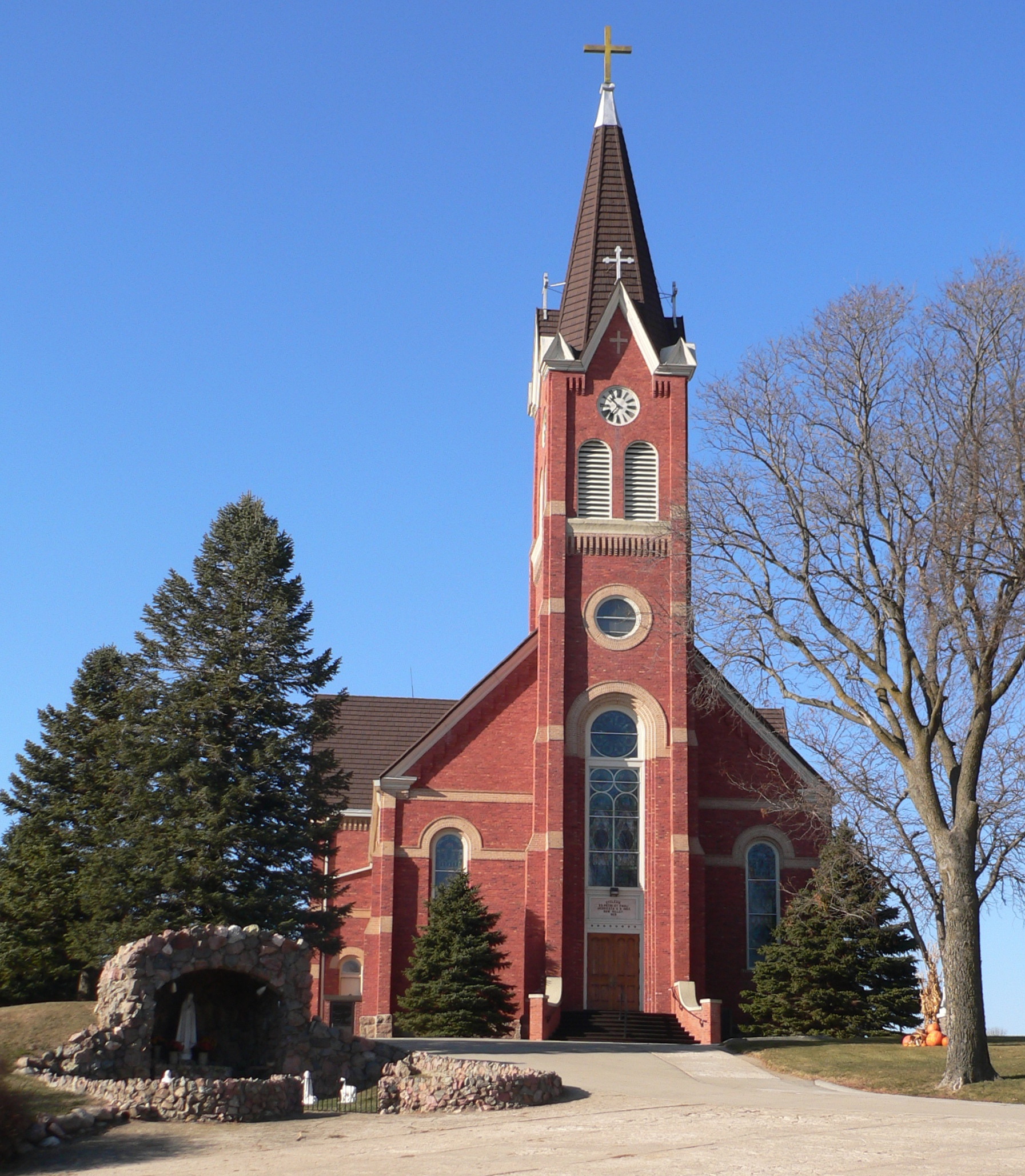

- Location within Nebraska Location within the United States
- Location: 106 W. 889th Rd., Bow Valley, Nebraska
- Coordinates: 42°42′53″N 97°15′3″W
- Area: 9 acres (3.6 ha)
- Built: 1904
- Built by: Stukenoff, Henry
- Architect: Schwartz, Josef
- Architectural style: Late Gothic Revival, Colonial Revival, et.al.
- NRHP reference No.: 00000765
- Added to NRHP: July 5, 2000

The Saints Peter and Paul Catholic Church Complex in Bow Valley, Nebraska was listed on the National Register of Historic Places in 2000. The church, built in 1903, is massive relative to the small size of the Bow Valley community.

The complex includes a rectory built in 1926, a school, and a Grotto of Our Lady of Fatima which was completed in 1952. There are in total five contributing buildings, plus a contributing site and a contributing object.
