= Burton, Nebraska =

- Village
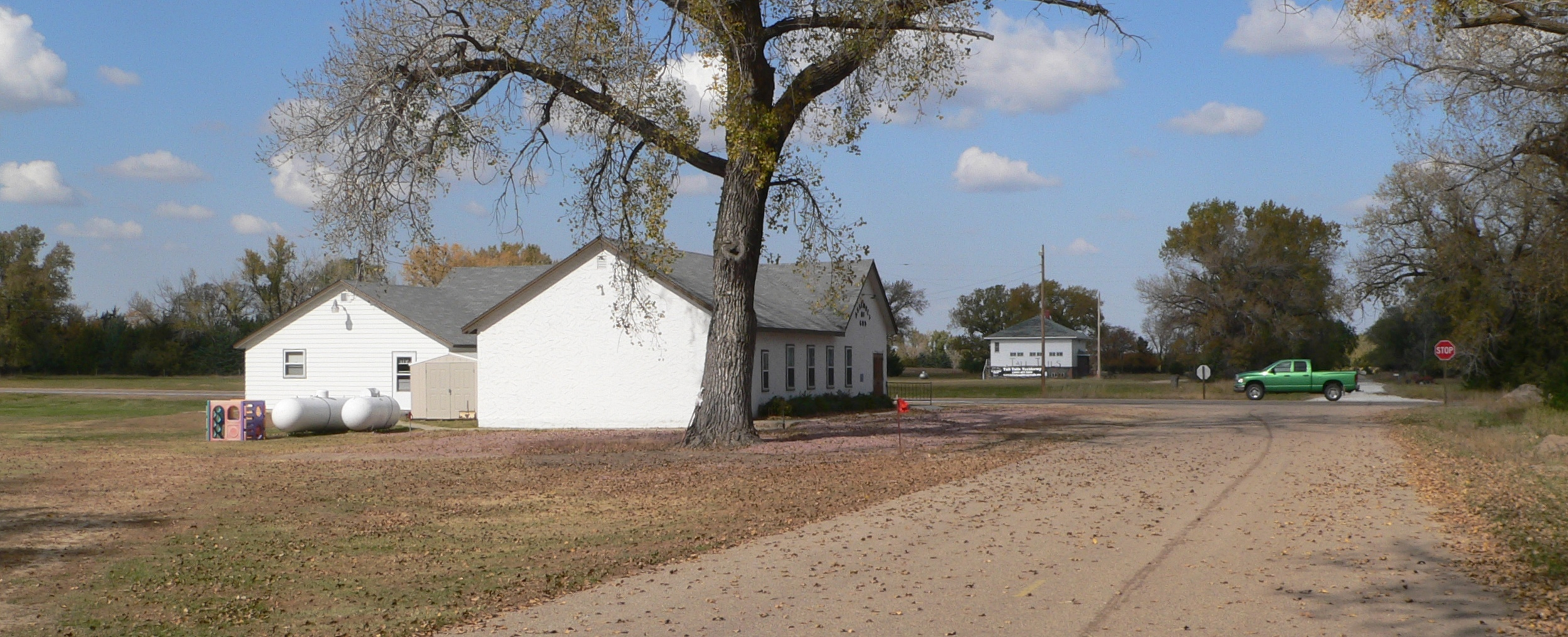
- Burton, seen from the south. The Assembly of God church is at left.

- Location of Burton, Nebraska
- Coordinates: 42°54′43″N 99°35′31″W
- Country: United States
- State: Nebraska
- County: Keya Paha

Area
  - Total: 0.10 sq mi (0.27 km^{2})
  - Land: 0.10 sq mi (0.27 km^{2})
  - Water: 0 sq mi (0.00 km^{2})
- Elevation: 2,139 ft (652 m)

Population (2020)
  - Total: 11
  - Estimate (2021): 11
  - Density: 104.3/sq mi (40.26/km^{2})
- Time zone: UTC-6 (Central (CST))
  - Summer (DST): UTC-5 (CDT)
- FIPS code: 31-07310
- GNIS feature ID: 2397508

Burton is a village in Keya Paha County, Nebraska, United States. The population was 11 at the 2020 census.

== History ==
Burton was platted in 1905. It was named for a storekeeper.

== Geography ==
According to the United States Census Bureau, the village has a total area of 0.11 square miles (0.28 km^{2}), all land.

== Demographics ==
Historical population
Census	Pop.	Note	%±
1920	98		—
1930	72		−26.5%
1940	105		45.8%
1950	45		−57.1%
1960	17		−62.2%
1970	23		35.3%
1980	12		−47.8%
1990	9		−25.0%
2000	11		22.2%
2010	10		−9.1%
2020	11		10.0%
U.S. Decennial Census; 2012 Estimate

=== 2010 census ===
As of the census of 2010, there were 10 people, 4 households, and 4 families residing in the village. The population density was 90.9 inhabitants per square mile (35.1/km^{2}). There were 6 housing units at an average density of 54.5 per square mile (21.0/km^{2}). The racial makeup of the village was 100.0% White.

There were 4 households, of which 25.0% had children under the age of 18 living with them, 75.0% were married couples living together, and 25.0% had a female householder with no husband present. 0.0% of all households were made up of individuals. The average household size was 2.50 and the average family size was 2.50.

The median age in the village was 41 years. 20% of residents were under the age of 18; 0.0% were between the ages of 18 and 24; 50% were from 25 to 44; 0.0% were from 45 to 64; and 30% were 65 years of age or older. The gender makeup of the village was 50.0% male and 50.0% female.

=== 2000 census ===
As of the census of 2000, there were 11 people, 4 households, and 4 families residing in the village. The population density was 102.6 inhabitants per square mile (39.6/km^{2}). There were 4 housing units at an average density of 37.3 per square mile (14.4/km^{2}). The racial makeup of the village was 100.00% White.

There were 4 households, out of which 25.0% had children under the age of 18 living with them, 75.0% were married couples living together, 25.0% had a female householder with no husband present, and 0.0% were non-families. No households were made up of individuals, and none had someone living alone who was 65 years of age or older. The average household size was 2.75 and the average family size was 2.75.

In the village, the population was spread out, with 27.3% under the age of 18, 9.1% from 18 to 24, 54.5% from 25 to 44, and 9.1% who were 65 years of age or older. The median age was 26 years. For every 100 females, there were 83.3 males. For every 100 females age 18 and over, there were 100.0 males.

As of 2000 the median income for a household in the village was $23,750, and the median income for a family was $23,750. Males had a median income of $0 versus $0 for females. The per capita income for the village was $11,800. None of the population and none of the families were below the poverty line.

== Notable person ==
- Burton Wilkinson, cricketer
