= Hartington Hotel =

- Hotel Hartington
- U.S. National Register of Historic Places
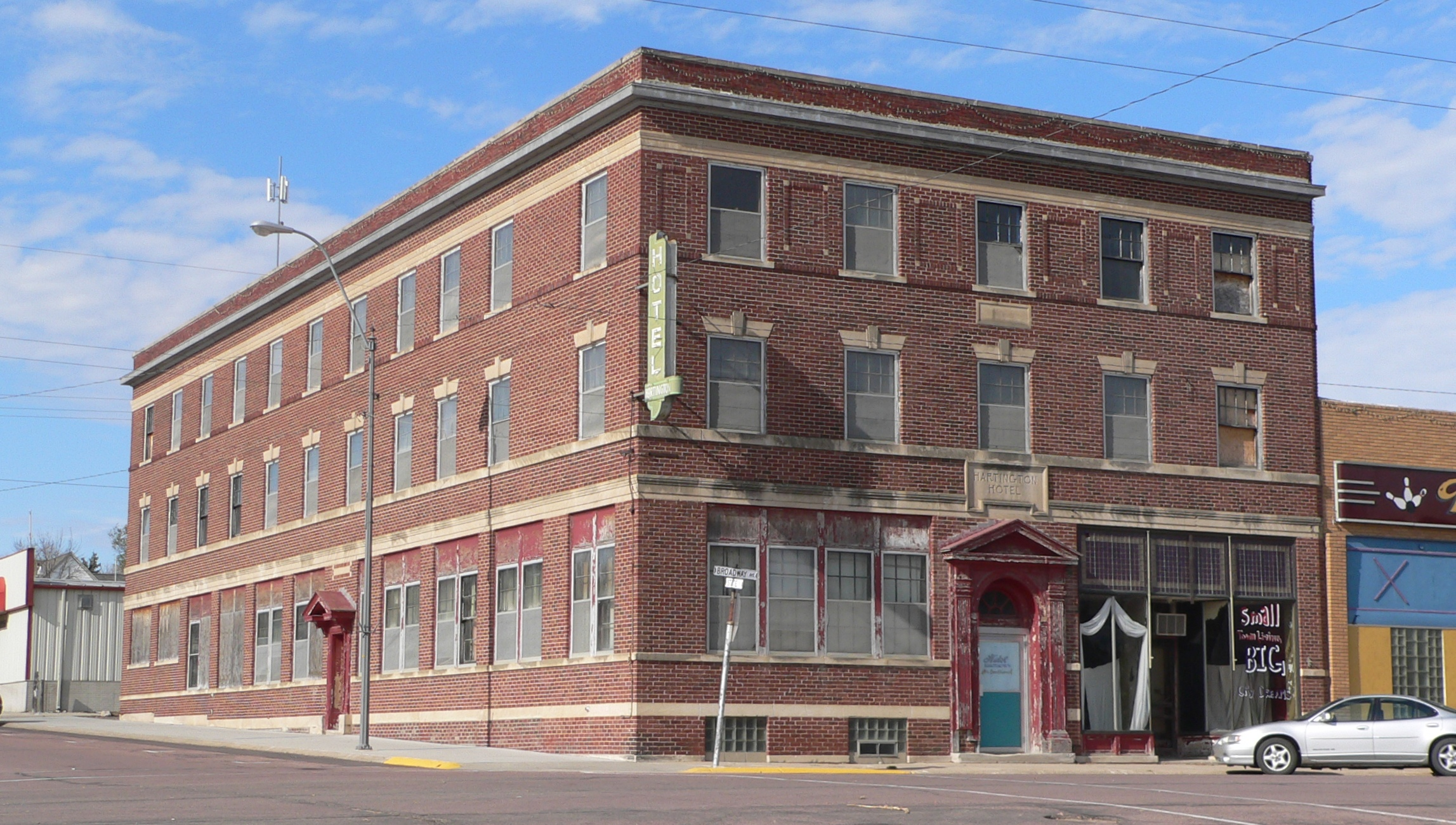

- Location within Nebraska Location within the United States
- Location: 202 North Broadway, Hartington, Nebraska
- Coordinates: 42°37′18″N 97°15′53″W
- Area: less than one acre
- Built: 1916–17
- Architect: P. Lewis
- Architectural style: Early Commercial
- NRHP reference No.: 03001219
- Added to NRHP: November 26, 2003

The Hartington Hotel in Hartington, Nebraska, is an Early Commercial-style hotel which was built during 1916–17. It was listed on the National Register of Historic Places in 2003.

It was deemed significant as "an excellent example of a small town commercial hotel."

Construction during 1916 was interrupted by a strike; bricklayers had been promised 80 cents per hour wages but the company was willing to pay only 75 cents.

In 2018, the hotel was remodelled using much of the original architecture and materials from the original building.
