= Brocksburg, Nebraska =

Unincorporated community in Nebraska, United States

- Unincorporated Community
- Location within Nebraska Location within the United States
- Coordinates: 42.9°N 99.3°W
- Country: United States
- State: Nebraska
- County: Keya Paha

Brocksburg is an unincorporated community in Keya Paha County, Nebraska, United States.

== History ==
Brocksburg was laid out by Henry Brockman and named for him. A post office was established at Brocksburg in 1899, and remained in operation until it was discontinued in 1957.
