= Keya Paha County, Nebraska =

County in Nebraska, United States

- County
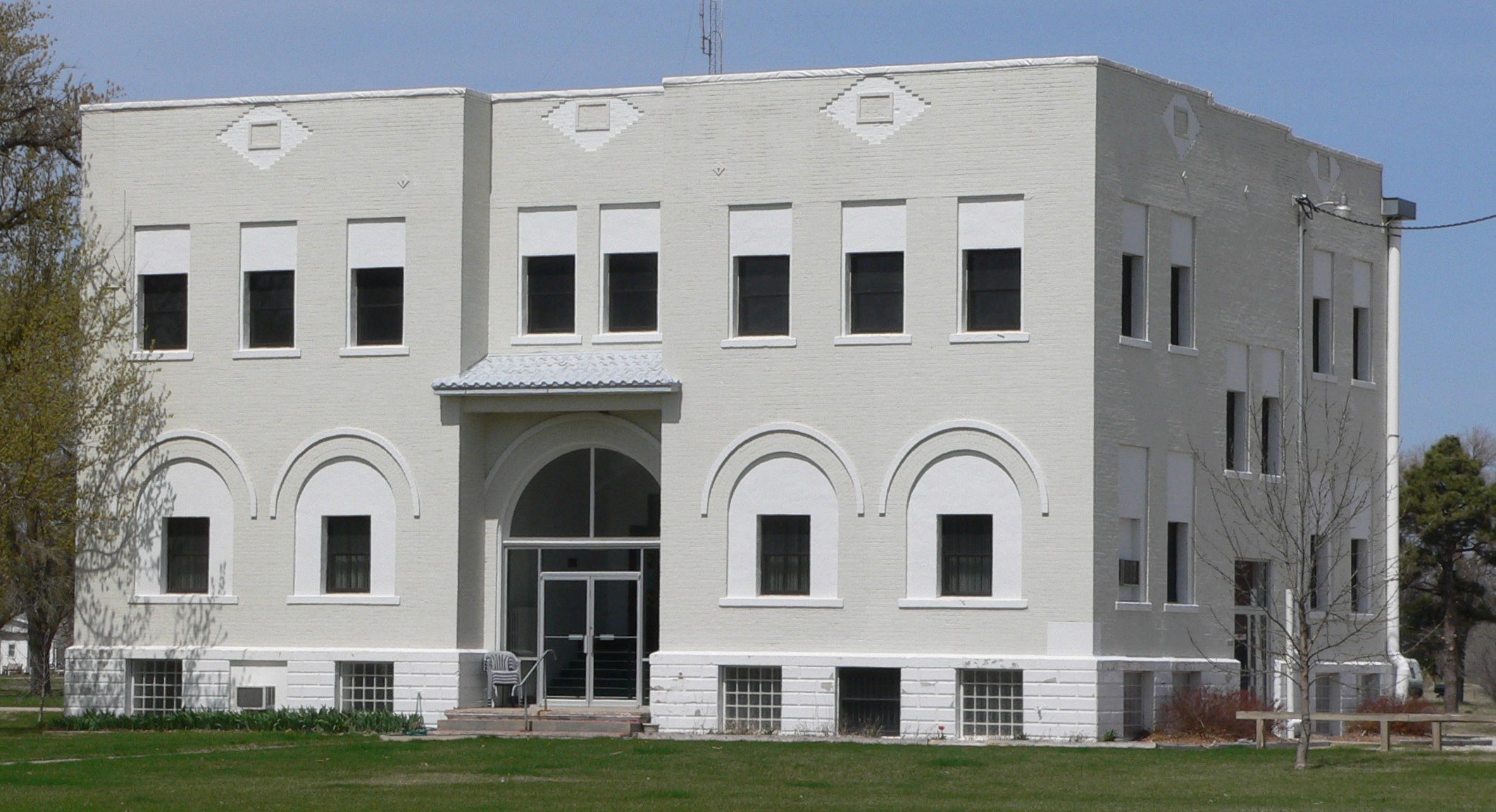
- The Keya Paha County Courthouse in Springview

- Location within the U.S. state of Nebraska
- Coordinates: 42.875480°N 99.718351°W
- Country: United States
- State: Nebraska
- Founded: December 17, 1884
- Named for: Dakota for “Turtle Hill River”
- Seat: Springview
- Largest village: Springview

Area
  - Total: 773.922 sq mi (2,004.45 km^{2})
  - Land: 772.876 sq mi (2,001.74 km^{2})
  - Water: 1.046 sq mi (2.71 km^{2}) 0.14%

Population (2020)
  - Total: 769
  - Estimate (2025): 792 ▲
  - Density: 0.995/sq mi (0.384/km^{2})
- Time zone: UTC−6 (Central)
  - Summer (DST): UTC−5 (CDT)
- Area code: 402 and 531
- Congressional district: 3rd
- Website: keyapahacountyne.gov
- • Nebraska county number 52 • Nebraska license plate prefix 82

Keya Paha County (/ˈkɪpəhɔː/ KIP-ə-haw) is a county in the U.S. state of Nebraska. As of the 2020 census, the population was 769, and was estimated to be 792 in 2025. The county seat and the largest village is Springview.

In the Nebraska license plate system, Keya Paha County was represented by the prefix "82" (as it had the 82nd-largest number of vehicles registered in the state when the license plate system was established in 1922).

== History ==
Keya Paha County was created on December 17, 1884 of land partitioned from Brown County.

The name "Keya Paha" is taken from the Dakota language; literally translated, it means "turtle hill". The Dakota name for a set of small hills was given to the county and to the Keya Paha River, which runs through it.

All land north of the Keya Paha River (which includes a small portion of Keya Paha County and most of neighboring Boyd County) was not originally part of Nebraska at the time of statehood, but was transferred from Dakota Territory in 1882.

== Geography ==
According to the United States Census Bureau, the county has a total area of 773.922 square miles (2,004.45 km^{2}), of which 772.876 square miles (2,001.74 km^{2}) is land and 1.046 square miles (2.71 km^{2}) (0.14%) is water. It is the 28th-largest county in Nebraska by total area.

Keya Paha County lies on the northern boundary of Nebraska, abutting the state of South Dakota. The county's terrain consists of low rolling hills, whose level areas are used for agriculture, including center pivot irrigation. The Keya Paha River flows east-southeastward through the northeastern part of the county, while the Niobrara River flows eastward along the south county line.

Keya Paha County is located in Nebraska's Outback region.

=== Major highways ===
- U.S. Highway 183
- Nebraska Highway 7
- Nebraska Highway 12
- Nebraska Highway 137

=== Adjacent counties ===
- Tripp County, South Dakota – north
- Gregory County, South Dakota – northeast
- Boyd County – east
- Holt County – southeast
- Rock County – south
- Brown County – south
- Cherry County – west
- Todd County, South Dakota – northwest

=== National protected area ===
- Niobrara National Scenic River (part)

== Demographics ==
Historical population
Census	Pop.	Note	%±
1890	3,920		—
1900	3,076		−21.5%
1910	3,452		12.2%
1920	3,594		4.1%
1930	3,203		−10.9%
1940	3,235		1.0%
1950	2,160		−33.2%
1960	1,672		−22.6%
1970	1,340		−19.9%
1980	1,301		−2.9%
1990	1,029		−20.9%
2000	983		−4.5%
2010	824		−16.2%
2020	769		−6.7%
2025 (est.)	792	▲	3.0%
U.S. Decennial Census; 1790–1960 1900–1990; 1990–2000 2010–2020

=== 2020 census ===
As of the 2020 census, the county had a population of 769. The median age was 49.1 years. 20.4% of residents were under the age of 18 and 28.3% of residents were 65 years of age or older. For every 100 females there were 101.3 males, and for every 100 females age 18 and over there were 100.0 males age 18 and over.

The racial makeup of the county was 95.8% White, 0.0% Black or African American, 0.3% American Indian and Alaska Native, 0.0% Asian, 0.1% Native Hawaiian and Pacific Islander, 0.8% from some other race, and 3.0% from two or more races. Hispanic or Latino residents of any race comprised 2.6% of the population.

0.0% of residents lived in urban areas, while 100.0% lived in rural areas.

There were 353 households in the county, of which 23.2% had children under the age of 18 living with them and 17.6% had a female householder with no spouse or partner present. About 33.4% of all households were made up of individuals and 15.6% had someone living alone who was 65 years of age or older.

There were 496 housing units, of which 28.8% were vacant. Among occupied housing units, 81.3% were owner-occupied and 18.7% were renter-occupied. The homeowner vacancy rate was 0.0% and the rental vacancy rate was 8.3%.

=== 2000 census ===
As of the 2000 census, there were 983 people, 409 households, and 292 families in the county. The population density was 1.3 people per square mile (0.50 people/km^{2}); there were 548 housing units at an average density of 0.7 units per square mile (0.27/km^{2}). The racial makeup of the county was 99.39% White, 0.20% Native American, and 0.41% from two or more races; 3.87% of the population were Hispanic or Latino of any race; 46.7% were of German, 10.6% English, 9.8% American, 7.0% Irish and 6.0% Swedish ancestry.

There were 409 households, out of which 24.90% had children under the age of 18 living with them, 64.30% were married couples living together, 4.40% had a female householder with no husband present, and 28.60% were non-families. 26.20% of all households were made up of individuals, and 13.90% had someone living alone who was 65 years of age or older. The average household size was 2.40 and the average family size was 2.91.

The county population contained 23.80% under the age of 18, 6.70% from 18 to 24, 23.40% from 25 to 44, 25.40% from 45 to 64, and 20.70% who were 65 years of age or older. The median age was 42 years. For every 100 females there were 101.40 males. For every 100 females age 18 and over, there were 101.90 males.

The median income for a household in the county was $24,911, and the median income for a family was $28,287. Males had a median income of $18,750 versus $19,107 for females. The per capita income for the county was $11,860. About 22.40% of families and 26.90% of the population were below the poverty line, including 34.30% of those under age 18 and 18.80% of those age 65 or over.

== Communities ==
=== Villages ===
- Burton
- Springview (county seat)

=== Unincorporated communities ===
- Jamison
- Meadville
- Mills
- Norden
- Riverview

=== Former communities ===
- Brocksburg

== Politics ==
Keya Paha County was the most Republican of all the counties in Nebraska, with 88.96% of its 548 registered voters registered as Republicans. The last Democratic presidential candidate to win the county was Woodrow Wilson in 1916. In 1932, it was one of only two counties in the state not to vote for Franklin D. Roosevelt. The county was also the only one statewide to reject FDR in all four of his runs and one of the westernmost to do so along with Utahs Kane and South Dakotas Lawrence counties. 1994, Ben Nelson was the last Democratic gubernatorial candidate to carry the county.

Political Party	Number of registered voters (March 1, 2026)	Percent
Republican	548	88.96%
Democratic	39	6.33%
Independent	27	4.38%
Libertarian	2	0.32%
Legal Marijuana Now	0	0.00%
Total	616	100.00%

United States presidential election results for Keya Paha County, Nebraska
Year	Republican		Democratic		Third party(ies)	
Year	No.	%	No.	%	No.	%
1900	380	49.74%	353	46.20%	31	4.06%
1904	448	62.14%	97	13.45%	176	24.41%
1908	422	50.06%	354	41.99%	67	7.95%
1912	259	32.09%	221	27.39%	327	40.52%
1916	316	39.75%	401	50.44%	78	9.81%
1920	479	64.73%	218	29.46%	43	5.81%
1924	504	41.48%	251	20.66%	460	37.86%
1928	989	79.76%	232	18.71%	19	1.53%
1932	675	50.52%	645	48.28%	16	1.20%
1936	830	59.58%	556	39.91%	7	0.50%
1940	1,004	66.67%	502	33.33%	0	0.00%
1944	781	70.04%	334	29.96%	0	0.00%
1948	538	57.54%	397	42.46%	0	0.00%
1952	785	79.05%	208	20.95%	0	0.00%
1956	635	70.71%	263	29.29%	0	0.00%
1960	646	72.83%	241	27.17%	0	0.00%
1964	506	61.26%	320	38.74%	0	0.00%
1968	531	76.96%	109	15.80%	50	7.25%
1972	563	79.41%	146	20.59%	0	0.00%
1976	405	60.72%	245	36.73%	17	2.55%
1980	526	76.45%	130	18.90%	32	4.65%
1984	507	79.84%	128	20.16%	0	0.00%
1988	446	74.96%	145	24.37%	4	0.67%
1992	368	58.32%	105	16.64%	158	25.04%
1996	385	72.10%	94	17.60%	55	10.30%
2000	422	82.26%	78	15.20%	13	2.53%
2004	442	80.51%	98	17.85%	9	1.64%
2008	409	76.74%	115	21.58%	9	1.69%
2012	393	81.20%	80	16.53%	11	2.27%
2016	460	88.63%	40	7.71%	19	3.66%
2020	476	89.81%	49	9.25%	5	0.94%
2024	500	91.74%	44	8.07%	1	0.18%

== See also ==
- National Register of Historic Places listings in Keya Paha County, Nebraska
