= Bow Valley, Nebraska =

- Unincorporated Community and Census-Designated Place
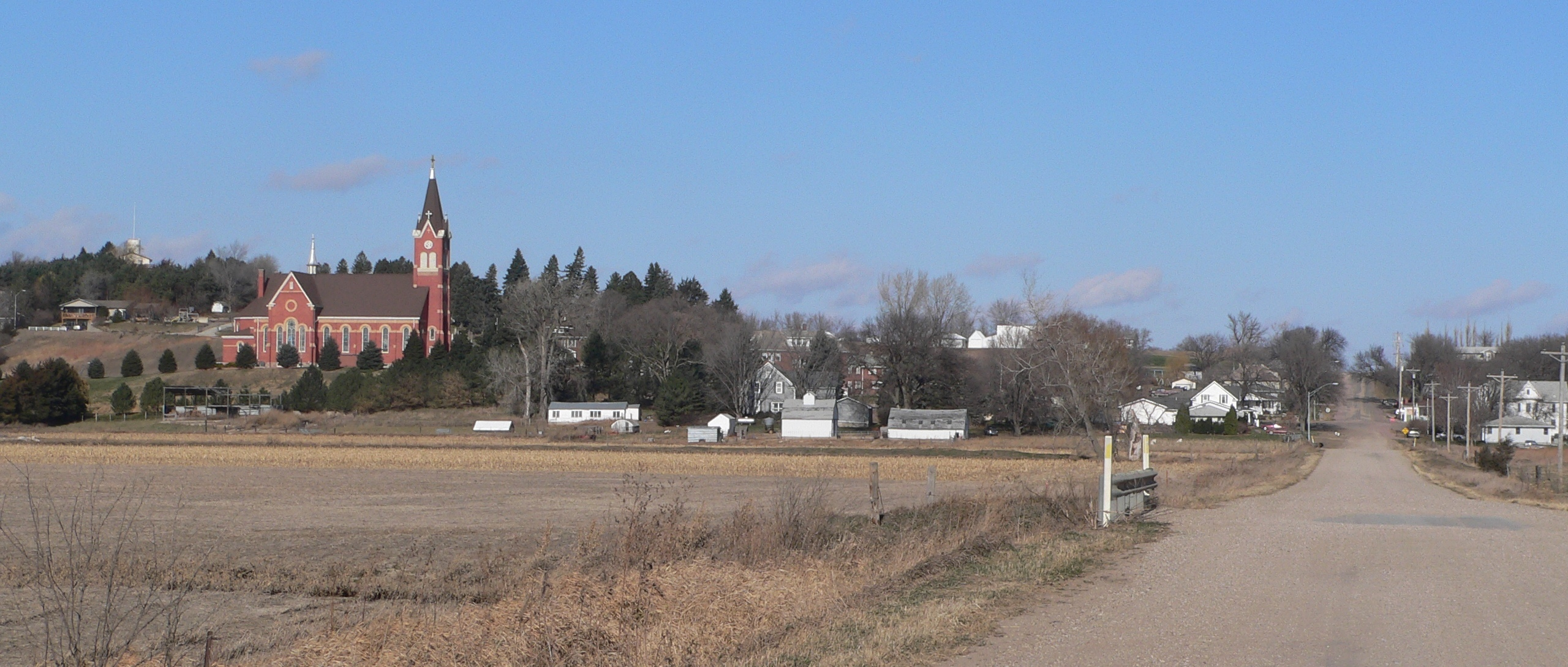

- Location within Nebraska Location within the United States
- Coordinates: 42°42′53″N 97°14′58″W
- Country: United States
- State: Nebraska
- County: Cedar

Area
  - Total: 0.14 sq mi (0.37 km^{2})
  - Land: 0.14 sq mi (0.37 km^{2})
  - Water: 0 sq mi (0.00 km^{2})
- Elevation: 1,329 ft (405 m)

Population (2020)
  - Total: 95
  - Density: 665.7/sq mi (257.02/km^{2})
- ZIP code: 68739
- Area codes: 402 and 531
- FIPS code: 31-05980
- GNIS feature ID: 2583876

Bow Valley is an unincorporated community and census-designated place (CDP) in Cedar County, Nebraska, United States. As of the 2020 census it had a population of 95.

== Geography ==
Bow Valley is located in northern Cedar County, in the valley of West Bow Creek, a tributary of the Missouri River. Nebraska Highway 12 passes one mile north of the community, leading east 33 miles (53 km) to Ponca and west 12 miles (19 km) to Crofton. Nebraska Highway 57 passes a mile west of Bow Valley, leading south 6 miles (10 km) to Hartington.

== Demographics ==
Historical population
Census	Pop.	Note	%±
2020	95		—
U.S. Decennial Census

== History ==
A post office was established at Bow Valley in 1871, and remained in operation until it was discontinued in 1907. The community takes its name from Bow Valley.
