= Springview, Nebraska =

- Village
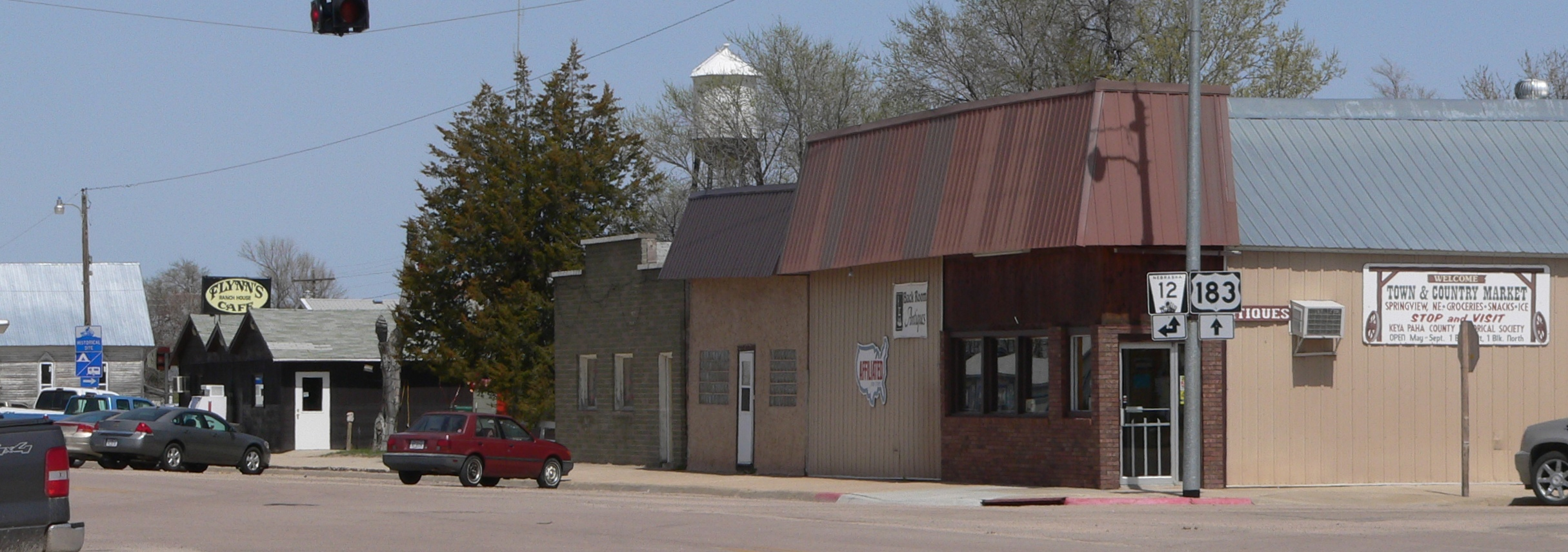
- Downtown Springview: east side of Main Street

- Location of Springview, Nebraska
- Coordinates: 42°49′26″N 99°45′10″W
- Country: United States
- State: Nebraska
- County: Keya Paha

Area
  - Total: 0.66 sq mi (1.72 km^{2})
  - Land: 0.66 sq mi (1.72 km^{2})
  - Water: 0 sq mi (0.00 km^{2})
- Elevation: 2,448 ft (746 m)

Population (2020)
  - Total: 238
  - Density: 358.5/sq mi (138.43/km^{2})
- Time zone: UTC-6 (Central (CST))
  - Summer (DST): UTC-5 (CDT)
- ZIP code: 68778
- Area code: 402
- FIPS code: 31-46625
- GNIS feature ID: 2399881
- Website: http://www.springview-ne.com/

Springview is a village in and the county seat of Keya Paha County, Nebraska, United States. As of the 2020 census, Springview had a population of 238.

== History ==
Springview was founded circa 1885. It was named for a spring near the town's center, which has since dried up. 160 acres of land for the village was contributed by J. F. Carr, Dave Wisemen, Ed Fleming, and a Mrs. Fleming (Ed's mother), who each contributed 40 acres.

== Geography ==
According to the United States Census Bureau, the village has a total area of 0.66 square miles (1.71 km^{2}), all land.

=== Climate ===
Climate data for Springview 2NW, Nebraska (1991–2020 normals, extremes 1893–present)
Month	Jan	Feb	Mar	Apr	May	Jun	Jul	Aug	Sep	Oct	Nov	Dec	Year
Record high °F (°C)	71 (22)	77 (25)	89 (32)	95 (35)	102 (39)	108 (42)	113 (45)	109 (43)	108 (42)	97 (36)	84 (29)	75 (24)	113 (45)
Mean maximum °F (°C)	58.7 (14.8)	62.4 (16.9)	75.5 (24.2)	82.5 (28.1)	90.0 (32.2)	94.8 (34.9)	102.0 (38.9)	99.3 (37.4)	95.3 (35.2)	86.8 (30.4)	72.3 (22.4)	59.9 (15.5)	102.9 (39.4)
Mean daily maximum °F (°C)	34.3 (1.3)	37.3 (2.9)	48.9 (9.4)	58.7 (14.8)	69.8 (21.0)	80.7 (27.1)	88.2 (31.2)	85.6 (29.8)	77.8 (25.4)	62.7 (17.1)	48.3 (9.1)	36.4 (2.4)	60.7 (15.9)
Daily mean °F (°C)	21.7 (−5.7)	24.6 (−4.1)	35.0 (1.7)	44.8 (7.1)	56.6 (13.7)	67.3 (19.6)	73.9 (23.3)	71.2 (21.8)	62.8 (17.1)	48.3 (9.1)	34.9 (1.6)	24.3 (−4.3)	47.1 (8.4)
Mean daily minimum °F (°C)	9.2 (−12.7)	12.0 (−11.1)	21.1 (−6.1)	30.9 (−0.6)	43.3 (6.3)	54.0 (12.2)	59.7 (15.4)	56.9 (13.8)	47.7 (8.7)	33.9 (1.1)	21.5 (−5.8)	12.3 (−10.9)	33.5 (0.8)
Mean minimum °F (°C)	−9.8 (−23.2)	−6.5 (−21.4)	1.5 (−16.9)	16.6 (−8.6)	30.0 (−1.1)	43.2 (6.2)	49.3 (9.6)	47.1 (8.4)	33.8 (1.0)	16.4 (−8.7)	3.9 (−15.6)	−6.9 (−21.6)	−15.0 (−26.1)
Record low °F (°C)	−34 (−37)	−30 (−34)	−21 (−29)	−1 (−18)	18 (−8)	33 (1)	39 (4)	20 (−7)	16 (−9)	3 (−16)	−28 (−33)	−31 (−35)	−34 (−37)
Average precipitation inches (mm)	0.34 (8.6)	0.46 (12)	0.98 (25)	2.21 (56)	4.05 (103)	4.03 (102)	2.66 (68)	2.83 (72)	2.57 (65)	1.55 (39)	0.48 (12)	0.42 (11)	22.58 (573.6)
Average snowfall inches (cm)	6.0 (15)	8.1 (21)	5.3 (13)	6.6 (17)	0.1 (0.25)	0.0 (0.0)	0.0 (0.0)	0.0 (0.0)	0.0 (0.0)	1.5 (3.8)	4.6 (12)	6.3 (16)	38.5 (98.05)
Average precipitation days (≥ 0.01 in)	1.8	2.2	3.3	5.5	8.9	8.4	6.1	5.8	5.0	4.3	2.6	2.3	56.2
Average snowy days (≥ 0.1 in)	2.7	3.1	2.1	1.7	0.0	0.0	0.0	0.0	0.0	0.6	2.2	2.6	15.0
Source: NOAA

== Demographics ==
Historical population
Census	Pop.	Note	%±
1900	188		—
1910	216		14.9%
1920	354		63.9%
1930	307		−13.3%
1940	347		13.0%
1950	298		−14.1%
1960	281		−5.7%
1970	260		−7.5%
1980	326		25.4%
1990	304		−6.7%
2000	244		−19.7%
2010	242		−0.8%
2020	238		−1.7%
U.S. Decennial Census; 2012 Estimate

=== 2010 census ===
At the 2010 census there were 242 people, 121 households, and 71 families in the village. The population density was 366.7 inhabitants per square mile (141.6/km^{2}). There were 165 housing units at an average density of 250.0 per square mile (96.5/km^{2}). The racial makeup of the village was 100.0% White. Hispanic or Latino of any race were 0.4%.

Of the 121 households 22.3% had children under the age of 18 living with them, 48.8% were married couples living together, 6.6% had a female householder with no husband present, 3.3% had a male householder with no wife present, and 41.3% were non-families. 38.8% of households were one person and 22.3% were one person aged 65 or older. The average household size was 2.00 and the average family size was 2.63.

The median age in the village was 50.2 years. 21.9% of residents were under the age of 18; 0.7% were between the ages of 18 and 24; 21% were from 25 to 44; 26.5% were from 45 to 64; and 29.8% were 65 or older. The gender makeup of the village was 43.8% male and 56.2% female.

=== 2000 census ===
At the 2000 census, there were 244 people, 122 households, and 67 families in the village. The population density was 1,000.6 inhabitants per square mile (386.3/km^{2}). There were 157 housing units at an average density of 643.8 per square mile (248.6/km^{2}). The racial makeup of the village was 100.00% White. Hispanic or Latino of any race were 1.64% of the population.

There were 122 households, of which 18.0% had children under the age of 18 living with them, 49.2% were married couples living together, 6.6% had a female householder with no husband present, and 44.3% were non-families. 42.6% of households were one person and 27.9% were one person aged 65 or older. The average household size was 2.00 and the average family size was 2.75.

The age distribution was 20.9% under the age of 18, 4.1% from 18 to 24, 18.4% from 25 to 44, 22.5% from 45 to 64, and 34.0% 65 or older. The median age was 52 years. For every 100 females, there were 84.8 males. For every 100 females age 18 and over, there were 80.4 males.

The median household income was $19,479, and the median family income was $26,389. Males had a median income of $16,406 versus $19,063 for females. The per capita income for the village was $11,851. About 26.3% of families and 32.8% of the population were below the poverty line, including 62.0% of those under the age of eighteen and 19.5% of those sixty five or over.
