= St. Helena, Nebraska =

- Village
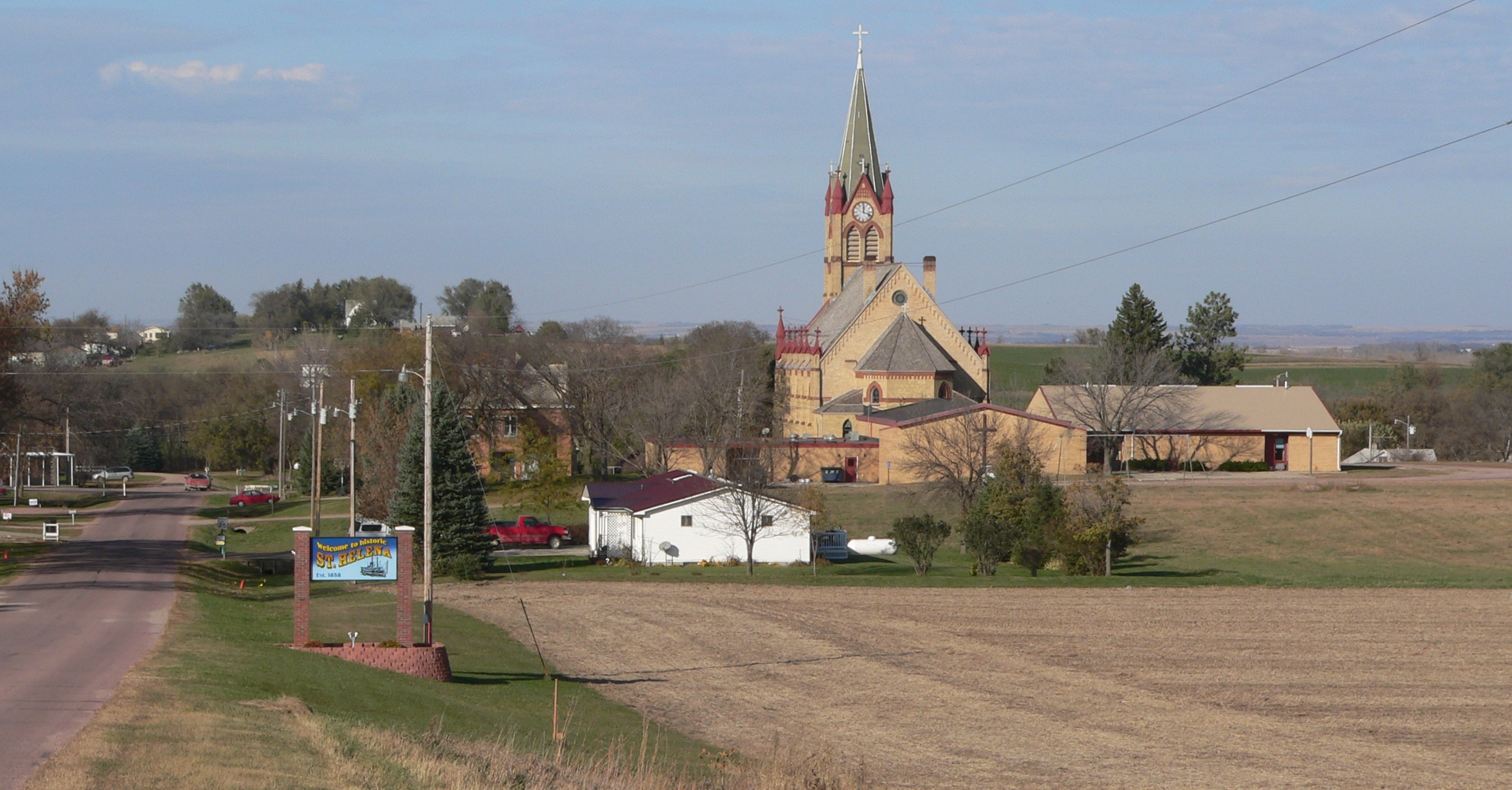
- St. Helena, seen from the south; in the center is Immaculate Conception Church

- Location of St. Helena, Nebraska
- Coordinates: 42°48′38″N 97°14′56″W
- Country: United States
- State: Nebraska
- County: Cedar

Area
  - Total: 0.44 sq mi (1.15 km^{2})
  - Land: 0.44 sq mi (1.15 km^{2})
  - Water: 0 sq mi (0.00 km^{2})
- Elevation: 1,240 ft (380 m)

Population (2020)
  - Total: 91
  - Estimate (2021): 90
  - Density: 200/sq mi (79/km^{2})
- Time zone: UTC-6 (Central (CST))
  - Summer (DST): UTC-5 (CDT)
- ZIP code: 68774
- Area codes: 402 and 531
- FIPS code: 31-43090
- GNIS feature ID: 2399163

St. Helena is a village in Cedar County, Nebraska, United States. The population was 91 at the 2020 census.

== History ==
St. Helena was settled in 1858. It once served as county seat.

== Geography ==
According to the United States Census Bureau, the village has a total area of 0.44 square miles (1.14 km^{2}), all land.

== Demographics ==
Historical population
Census	Pop.	Note	%±
1880	200		—
1890	189		−5.5%
1900	151		−20.1%
1910	148		−2.0%
1920	124		−16.2%
1930	83		−33.1%
1940	92		10.8%
1950	77		−16.3%
1960	63		−18.2%
1970	102		61.9%
1980	111		8.8%
1990	87		−21.6%
2000	86		−1.1%
2010	96		11.6%
2020	89		−7.3%
U.S. Decennial Census

=== 2010 census ===
As of the census of 2010, there were 96 people, 36 households, and 30 families living in the village. The population density was 218.2 inhabitants per square mile (84.2/km^{2}). There were 39 housing units at an average density of 88.6 per square mile (34.2/km^{2}). The racial makeup of the village was 99.0% White and 1.0% Native American.

There were 36 households, of which 27.8% had children under the age of 18 living with them, 69.4% were married couples living together, 5.6% had a female householder with no husband present, 8.3% had a male householder with no wife present, and 16.7% were non-families. 11.1% of all households were made up of individuals, and 8.4% had someone living alone who was 65 years of age or older. The average household size was 2.67 and the average family size was 2.83.

The median age in the village was 45 years. 25% of residents were under the age of 18; 2.1% were between the ages of 18 and 24; 22.9% were from 25 to 44; 21.9% were from 45 to 64; and 28.1% were 65 years of age or older. The gender makeup of the village was 51.0% male and 49.0% female.

=== 2000 census ===
As of the census of 2000, there were 86 people, 37 households, and 26 families living in the village. The population density was 204.5 inhabitants per square mile (79.0/km^{2}). There were 38 housing units at an average density of 90.3 per square mile (34.9/km^{2}). The racial makeup of the village was 100.00% White.

There were 37 households, out of which 29.7% had children under the age of 18 living with them, 64.9% were married couples living together, 2.7% had a female householder with no husband present, and 29.7% were non-families. 29.7% of all households were made up of individuals, and 16.2% had someone living alone who was 65 years of age or older. The average household size was 2.32 and the average family size was 2.88.

In the village, the population was spread out, with 24.4% under the age of 18, 2.3% from 18 to 24, 24.4% from 25 to 44, 31.4% from 45 to 64, and 17.4% who were 65 years of age or older. The median age was 42 years. For every 100 females, there were 95.5 males. For every 100 females age 18 and over, there were 97.0 males.

As of 2000 the median income for a household in the village was $41,875, and the median income for a family was $46,563. Males had a median income of $26,667 versus $16,806 for females. The per capita income for the village was $18,394. None of the population and none of the families were below the poverty line.

== Notable person ==
- Justin Bruening, actor
