= Menominee, Nebraska =

Unincorporated community in Nebraska, U.S.

Coordinates: 42°47′13″N 97°22′28″W

Menominee is an unincorporated community in Cedar County, Nebraska, United States.

== History ==
A post office was established at Menominee in 1872, and remained in operation until it was discontinued in 1902.
