= Wynot, Nebraska =

- Village
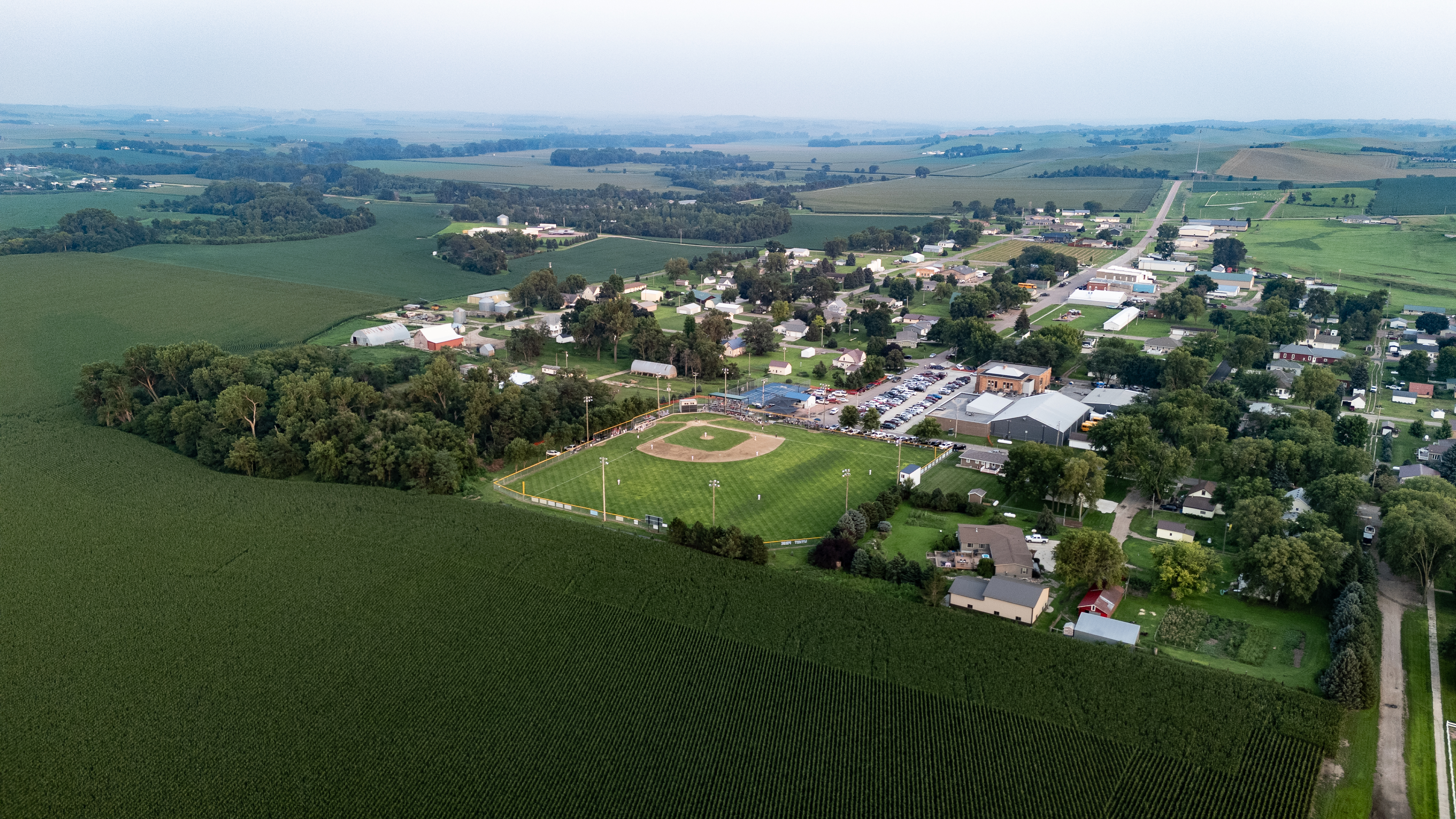
- Wynot, Nebraska seen from the north during the 2025 SD District 6B Amateur Baseball Tournament

- Location of Wynot, Nebraska
- Coordinates: 42°44′23″N 97°10′11″W
- Country: United States
- State: Nebraska
- County: Cedar

Area
  - Total: 0.19 sq mi (0.48 km^{2})
  - Land: 0.19 sq mi (0.48 km^{2})
  - Water: 0 sq mi (0.00 km^{2})
- Elevation: 1,198 ft (365 m)

Population (2020)
  - Total: 217
  - Estimate (2021): 215
  - Density: 1,200/sq mi (450/km^{2})
- Time zone: UTC-6 (Central (CST))
  - Summer (DST): UTC-5 (CDT)
- ZIP code: 68792
- Area code: 402
- FIPS code: 31-53905
- GNIS feature ID: 2399747
- Website: www.wynotnebraska.com

Wynot is a village in Cedar County, Nebraska, United States. The population was 217 at the 2020 census.

== History ==
Wynot got its start following construction of the railroad through the territory. According to tradition, it was derived from an old German settler's common answer of "Why not?"

== Geography ==
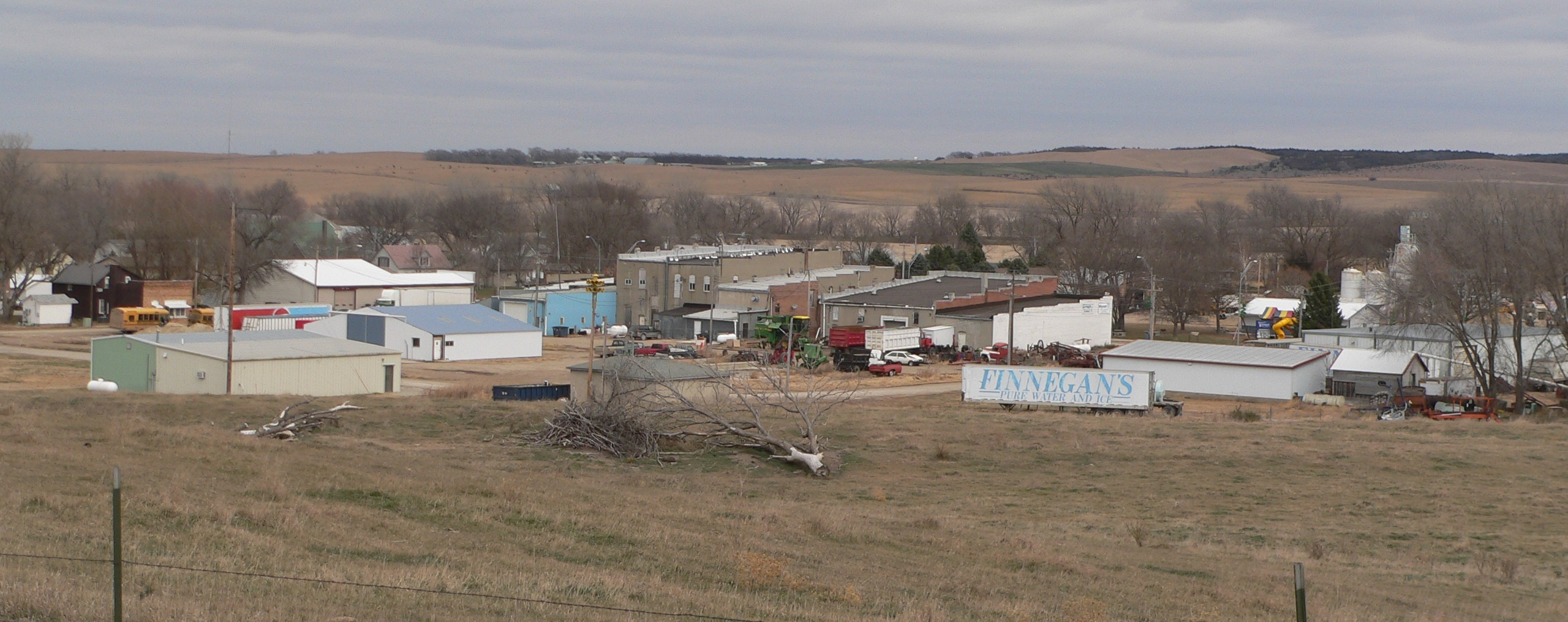
Wynot, seen from the southwest

According to the United States Census Bureau, the village has a total area of 0.18 square miles (0.47 km^{2}), all land.

== Demographics ==
Historical population
Census	Pop.	Note	%±
1910	258		—
1920	368		42.6%
1930	348		−5.4%
1940	416		19.5%
1950	233		−44.0%
1960	209		−10.3%
1970	226		8.1%
1980	222		−1.8%
1990	213		−4.1%
2000	191		−10.3%
2010	166		−13.1%
2020	216		30.1%
U.S. Decennial Census

=== 2010 census ===
As of the census of 2010, there were 166 people, 77 households, and 51 families living in the village. The population density was 922.2 inhabitants per square mile (356.1/km^{2}). There were 89 housing units at an average density of 494.4 per square mile (190.9/km^{2}). The racial makeup of the village was 99.4% White and 0.6% from two or more races.

There were 77 households, of which 23.4% had children under the age of 18 living with them, 55.8% were married couples living together, 5.2% had a female householder with no husband present, 5.2% had a male householder with no wife present, and 33.8% were non-families. 31.2% of all households were made up of individuals, and 13% had someone living alone who was 65 years of age or older. The average household size was 2.16 and the average family size was 2.71.

The median age in the village was 50 years. 21.7% of residents were under the age of 18; 1.7% were between the ages of 18 and 24; 19.2% were from 25 to 44; 30.6% were from 45 to 64; and 26.5% were 65 years of age or older. The gender makeup of the village was 48.2% male and 51.8% female.

=== 2000 census ===
As of the census of 2000, there were 191 people, 83 households, and 52 families living in the village. The population density was 997.8 inhabitants per square mile (385.3/km^{2}). There were 90 housing units at an average density of 470.2 per square mile (181.5/km^{2}). The racial makeup of the village was 100.00% White.

There were 83 households, out of which 28.9% had children under the age of 18 living with them, 48.2% were married couples living together, 10.8% had a female householder with no husband present, and 37.3% were non-families. 32.5% of all households were made up of individuals, and 16.9% had someone living alone who was 65 years of age or older. The average household size was 2.30 and the average family size was 3.00.

In the village, the population was spread out, with 26.2% under the age of 18, 6.3% from 18 to 24, 27.2% from 25 to 44, 18.8% from 45 to 64, and 21.5% who were 65 years of age or older. The median age was 40 years. For every 100 females, there were 103.2 males. For every 100 females age 18 and over, there were 101.4 males.

As of 2000 the median income for a household in the village was $27,750, and the median income for a family was $38,750. Males had a median income of $21,389 versus $19,688 for females. The per capita income for the village was $14,937. None of the families and 3.4% of the population were living below the poverty line, including no under eighteens and 16.2% of those over 64.

== See also ==
- Whynot, North Carolina
