= Pender Public Schools =

School district in Nebraska, United States

Pender Public Schools is a school district located in the town of Pender in northeast Nebraska, United States. Pender Public Schools serves students in kindergarten through twelfth grade, as well as pre-school students.

For the 2011–2012 school year, Pender Public Schools had an enrollment of 345 students. The school is in Class D1 (Nebraska School Activities Association) and Class III (Nebraska Department of Education).

== Boundary ==
Much of the district is in Thurston County, where it includes Pender and Thurston. In that county the district has all of the townships of Pender and Thayer, most of Flournoy Township, and sections of Bryan, Merry, and Perry townships.

It also includes sections in Cuming County. There it includes much of Cleveland Township and portions of Bancroft, Beemer, Grant, and Logan townships.

It also includes sections in Wayne County. There, it includes portions of Leslie, Logan, and Plum Creek precincts.
