= Cleveland Township, Nebraska =

Cleveland Township, Nebraska may refer to the following places in Nebraska:

- Cleveland Township, Cuming County, Nebraska
- Cleveland Township, Holt County, Nebraska
- Cleveland Township, Knox County, Nebraska

== See also ==
- Cleveland Township (disambiguation)
