= Anderson Township, Nebraska =

Anderson Township, Nebraska may refer to the following places in Nebraska:

- Anderson Township, Phelps County, Nebraska
- Anderson Township, Thurston County, Nebraska

== See also ==
- Anderson Township (disambiguation)
