= Anderson Township =

Anderson Township may refer to:

== Illinois ==
- Anderson Township, Clark County, Illinois

== Indiana ==
- Anderson Township, Madison County, Indiana
- Anderson Township, Perry County, Indiana
- Anderson Township, Rush County, Indiana
- Anderson Township, Warrick County, Indiana

== Iowa ==
- Anderson Township, Mills County, Iowa

== Missouri ==
- Anderson Township, New Madrid County, Missouri, in Caswell County, North Carolina

== Nebraska ==
- Anderson Township, Phelps County, Nebraska
- Anderson Township, Thurston County, Nebraska

== North Carolina ==
- Anderson Township, Caswell County, North Carolina

== North Dakota ==
- Anderson Township, Barnes County, North Dakota

== Ohio ==
- Anderson Township, Hamilton County, Ohio

== South Dakota ==
- Anderson Township, Perkins County, South Dakota
