= Umoⁿhoⁿ Nation Public Schools =

Omaha Nation Public Schools
- Umo^{n}ho^{n} Nation Public Schools
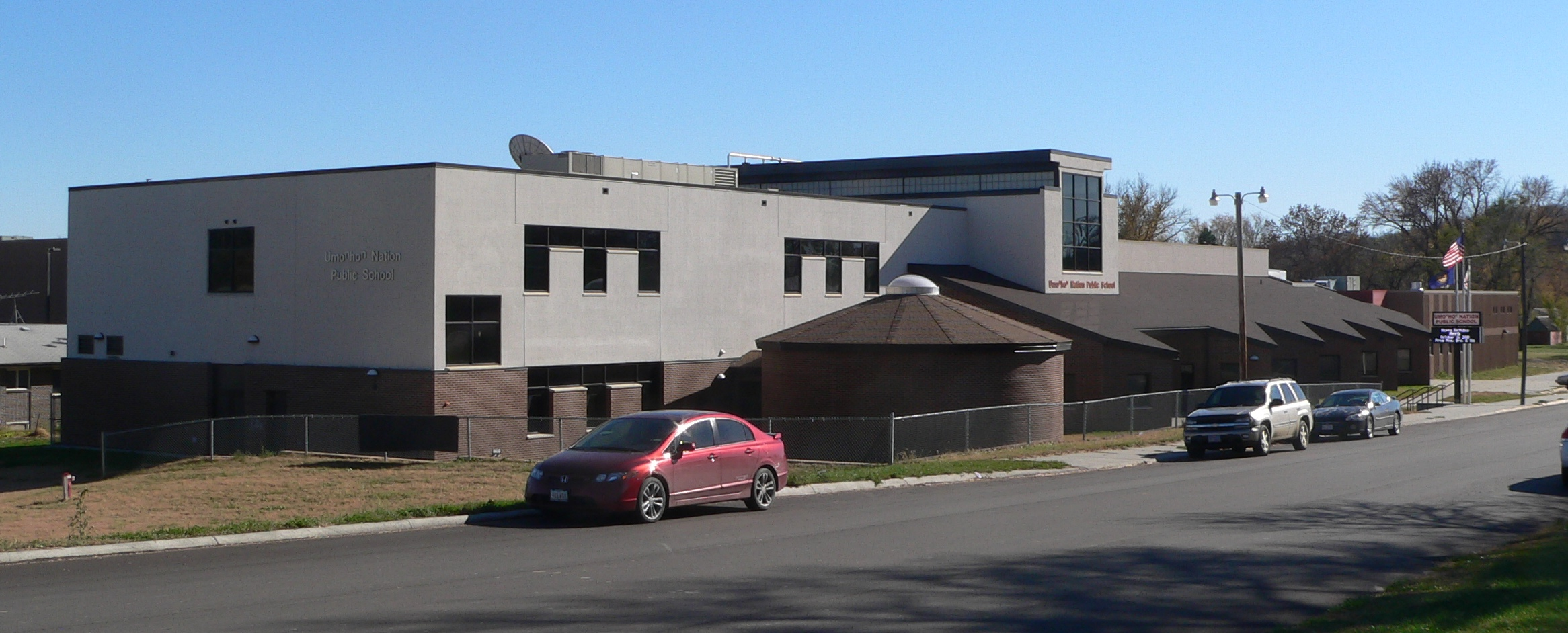

Location
- 100 Main Street; Macy, Nebraska 68039; United States
- Coordinates: 42°06′48″N 96°21′19″W

Information
- Superintendent: Stacie Hardy
- Principal: Broderick Steed
- Staff: 34.5 (FTE) (as of 2007-08)
- Teaching staff: 45.9 (FTE) (as of 2007-08)
- Grades: PreK-12
- Enrollment: 408 (as of 2007-08)
- Student to teacher ratio: 8.9 (as of 2007-08)
- Colors: Red and gold
- Athletics: NSAA D
- Athletics conference: Independent
- Mascot: Chiefs
- Website: http://www.unpsk-12.org/

Umo^{n}ho^{n} Nation (Omaha Nation) Public Schools (UNSPS), also known as Omaha Nation Public Schools, is a school district headquartered in Macy, Nebraska. The district covers Pre-Kindergarten through Grade 12.

Macy is the center of tribal government for the Omaha.

The district is in Thurston County, including sections of Blackbird Township and Anderson Township.

== History ==
In the years prior to 2023 the school engaged in a community garden project that focused on health and post-school career prospects. It is a part of a Nebraska Jobs for America's Graduates (JAG) program. By 2024 the school began using the program to have a cafeteria that is focused on Native American cuisine.

== Campus ==
A main building and four outlying buildings are divided into three grade levels: K-5 (elementary), 6-7-8 (middle school) and 9-12 (high school).

== Curriculum ==
Omaha Nation is a school-wide Title I school and has Success for All Reading and Math in the elementary school and Expeditionary Learning in the high school as Comprehensive School Reform projects.

== Extracurricular activities ==
Omaha Nation student groups and activities include band, class officers and activities, newspaper, science fair, ski club, and student council.

The school's teams, known as the Omaha Nation Chiefs, compete in Nebraska School Activities Association size classification D, used for the smallest schools in the state. Teams are fielded in basketball, football, track, volleyball, and weightlifting.
