= 2004 United States presidential election in Nebraska =

- November 2, 2004
- Turnout: 67.1% (of registered voters); 60.0% (of voting age population)

Nominee	George W. Bush	John Kerry
Party	Republican	Democratic
Home state	Texas	Massachusetts
Running mate	Dick Cheney	John Edwards
Electoral vote	5	0
Popular vote	512,814	254,328
Percentage	65.90%	32.68%

Bush
50–60%
60–70%
70–80%
80–90%
90–100%
Kerry
50–60%
President before election
George W. Bush
Republican
Elected President
George W. Bush
Republican

The 2004 United States presidential election in Nebraska took place on November 2, 2004, and was part of the 2004 United States presidential election. Voters chose five electors to the Electoral College, who voted for president and vice president.

Nebraska is notable as one of the two states (the other being Maine) that awards electoral votes based on the winners of each congressional district. The statewide winner receives two electoral votes, and the remaining 3 are awarded based on the winner of each individual congressional district.

Nebraska, a rural Great Plains state, is a Republican and conservative stronghold. Prior to the election, it was regarded as a state Bush would easily win or a safe red state.

Voters here gave an overwhelming statewide victory to George W. Bush, who received more than twice the number of votes of his challenger, John F. Kerry. Bush who carried the state in 2000 increased his margin of victory, from 29% (2000) to 33% in 2004. Bush also won all three congressional districts, so he received all five of the states electoral votes.

Bush also carried every county except substantially Native American Thurston County which Kerry won by a narrow 2.43 percent margin.

With 65.9% of the popular vote, Nebraska would prove to be Bush's fourth strongest state in the 2004 election after Utah, Wyoming and Idaho. This is the last time any candidate won Nebraska with more than 60% of the vote.

== Predictions ==
There were 12 news organizations who made state-by-state predictions of the election. Here are their last predictions before election day.

Source	Ranking
D.C. Political Report	Solid R
Associated Press	Solid R
CNN	Likely R
Cook Political Report	Solid R
Newsweek	Solid R
New York Times	Solid R
Rasmussen Reports	Likely R
Research 2000	Solid R
Washington Post	Likely R
Washington Times	Solid R
Zogby International	Likely R
Washington Dispatch	Likely R

== Results ==
Presidential Candidate	Running Mate	Party	Electoral Vote (EV)	Popular Vote (PV)	
George W. Bush of Texas (incumbent)	Richard Cheney of Wyoming (incumbent)	Republican	5	512,814	65.90%
John Kerry of Massachusetts	John Edwards of North Carolina	Democrat	0	254,328	32.68%
Ralph Nader of Connecticut	Peter Camejo of California	By Petition	0	5,698	0.73%
Michael Badnarik of Texas	Richard Campagna of Iowa	Libertarian	0	2,041	0.26%
Michael Peroutka of Maryland	Chuck Baldwin of Florida	Nebraska	0	1,314	0.17%
David Cobb of Texas	Pat LaMarche of Maine	Green	0	978	0.13%
–	–	Write-ins	0	931	0.12%
Róger Calero of New Jersey	Arrin Hawkins of New York	By Petition	0	82	0.01%

=== By county ===
County	George W. Bush Republican		John Kerry Democratic		Ralph Nader By Petition		Michael Badarnik Libertarian		Michael Peroutka Nebraska		Various candidates Other parties		Margin		Total votes cast
County	#	%	#	%	#	%	#	%	#	%	#	%	#	%	Total votes cast
Adams	9,233	69.49%	3,791	28.53%	132	0.99%	37	0.28%	48	0.36%	45	0.34%	5,442	40.96%	13,286
Antelope	2,761	80.64%	613	17.90%	27	0.79%	11	0.32%	7	0.20%	5	0.15%	2,148	62.73%	3,424
Arthur	240	90.23%	24	9.02%	2	0.75%	0	0.00%	0	0.00%	0	0.00%	216	81.20%	266
Banner	379	86.73%	56	12.81%	1	0.23%	1	0.23%	0	0.00%	0	0.00%	323	73.91%	437
Blaine	301	88.79%	38	11.21%	0	0.00%	0	0.00%	0	0.00%	0	0.00%	263	77.58%	339
Boone	2,309	79.76%	546	18.86%	20	0.69%	6	0.21%	10	0.35%	4	0.14%	1,763	60.90%	2,895
Box Butte	3,396	65.92%	1,657	32.16%	55	1.07%	11	0.21%	19	0.37%	14	0.28%	1,739	33.76%	5,152
Boyd	911	79.36%	228	19.86%	5	0.44%	3	0.26%	1	0.09%	0	0.00%	683	59.49%	1,148
Brown	1,426	82.29%	268	15.46%	13	0.75%	4	0.23%	19	1.10%	3	0.18%	1,158	66.83%	1,733
Buffalo	14,222	76.43%	4,100	22.03%	154	0.83%	57	0.31%	35	0.19%	40	0.21%	10,122	54.40%	18,608
Burt	2,349	64.04%	1,272	34.68%	23	0.63%	9	0.25%	6	0.16%	9	0.25%	1,077	29.36%	3,668
Butler	3,016	72.36%	1,068	25.62%	53	1.27%	6	0.14%	15	0.36%	10	0.24%	1,948	46.74%	4,168
Cass	7,763	67.33%	3,619	31.39%	80	0.69%	27	0.23%	11	0.10%	29	0.25%	4,144	35.94%	11,529
Cedar	3,387	74.67%	1,083	23.88%	43	0.95%	7	0.15%	11	0.24%	5	0.11%	2,304	50.79%	4,536
Chase	1,652	83.73%	302	15.31%	7	0.35%	8	0.41%	2	0.10%	2	0.10%	1,350	68.42%	1,973
Cherry	2,509	82.48%	483	15.88%	28	0.92%	9	0.30%	12	0.39%	1	0.03%	2,026	66.60%	3,042
Cheyenne	3,791	79.88%	893	18.82%	32	0.67%	10	0.21%	13	0.27%	7	0.15%	2,898	61.06%	4,746
Clay	2,543	76.21%	743	22.27%	31	0.93%	6	0.18%	8	0.24%	6	0.18%	1,800	53.94%	3,337
Colfax	2,589	71.26%	990	27.25%	40	1.10%	3	0.08%	6	0.17%	5	0.14%	1,599	44.01%	3,633
Cuming	3,330	76.57%	966	22.21%	29	0.67%	6	0.14%	6	0.14%	12	0.28%	2,364	54.36%	4,349
Custer	4,518	80.51%	1,040	18.53%	24	0.43%	14	0.25%	11	0.20%	5	0.09%	3,478	61.97%	5,612
Dakota	3,526	53.30%	3,027	45.76%	31	0.47%	9	0.14%	12	0.18%	10	0.16%	499	7.54%	6,615
Dawes	2,809	70.33%	1,119	28.02%	38	0.95%	10	0.25%	7	0.18%	11	0.28%	1,690	42.31%	3,994
Dawson	6,149	77.29%	1,728	21.72%	45	0.57%	20	0.25%	10	0.13%	4	0.05%	4,421	55.57%	7,956
Deuel	820	77.87%	222	21.08%	5	0.47%	3	0.28%	2	0.19%	1	0.09%	598	56.79%	1,053
Dixon	2,028	67.40%	938	31.17%	22	0.73%	7	0.23%	7	0.23%	7	0.23%	1,090	36.22%	3,009
Dodge	10,716	66.26%	5,250	32.46%	116	0.72%	46	0.28%	24	0.15%	20	0.12%	5,466	33.80%	16,172
Douglas	120,813	58.34%	83,330	40.24%	1,462	0.71%	641	0.31%	253	0.12%	572	0.28%	37,483	18.10%	207,071
Dundy	858	81.48%	186	17.66%	4	0.38%	4	0.38%	1	0.09%	0	0.00%	672	63.82%	1,053
Fillmore	2,314	72.47%	828	25.93%	27	0.85%	9	0.28%	9	0.28%	6	0.19%	1,486	46.54%	3,193
Franklin	1,277	74.50%	412	24.04%	11	0.64%	6	0.35%	5	0.29%	3	0.18%	865	50.47%	1,714
Frontier	1,160	79.07%	275	18.75%	14	0.95%	8	0.55%	6	0.41%	4	0.27%	885	60.33%	1,467
Furnas	1,950	79.04%	492	19.94%	16	0.65%	3	0.12%	4	0.16%	2	0.08%	1,458	59.10%	2,467
Gage	6,575	63.32%	3,655	35.20%	82	0.79%	28	0.27%	21	0.20%	23	0.22%	2,920	28.12%	10,384
Garden	970	81.99%	201	16.99%	9	0.76%	2	0.17%	1	0.08%	0	0.00%	769	65.00%	1,183
Garfield	806	79.25%	196	19.27%	12	1.18%	1	0.10%	1	0.10%	1	0.10%	610	59.98%	1,017
Gosper	890	79.54%	222	19.84%	5	0.45%	1	0.09%	1	0.09%	0	0.00%	668	59.70%	1,119
Grant	352	88.89%	41	10.35%	2	0.51%	1	0.25%	0	0.00%	0	0.00%	311	78.54%	396
Greeley	865	69.31%	361	28.93%	15	1.20%	1	0.08%	6	0.48%	0	0.00%	504	40.38%	1,248
Hall	14,592	68.98%	6,228	29.44%	197	0.93%	41	0.19%	42	0.20%	54	0.26%	8,364	39.54%	21,154
Hamilton	3,785	77.78%	1,012	20.80%	50	1.03%	4	0.08%	10	0.21%	5	0.10%	2,773	56.99%	4,866
Harlan	1,467	77.33%	398	20.98%	22	1.16%	2	0.11%	7	0.37%	1	0.05%	1,069	56.35%	1,897
Hayes	524	87.63%	66	11.04%	2	0.33%	1	0.17%	1	0.17%	4	0.67%	458	76.59%	598
Hitchcock	1,171	78.80%	296	19.92%	9	0.61%	2	0.13%	8	0.54%	0	0.00%	875	58.88%	1,486
Holt	4,217	81.50%	894	17.28%	28	0.54%	10	0.19%	19	0.37%	6	0.12%	3,323	64.22%	5,174
Hooker	392	85.03%	64	13.88%	2	0.43%	1	0.22%	2	0.43%	0	0.00%	328	71.15%	461
Howard	2,020	67.81%	900	30.21%	34	1.14%	10	0.34%	8	0.27%	7	0.23%	1,120	37.60%	2,979
Jefferson	2,600	64.82%	1,352	33.71%	29	0.72%	13	0.32%	6	0.15%	11	0.27%	1,248	31.11%	4,011
Johnson	1,470	61.40%	885	36.97%	25	1.04%	4	0.17%	2	0.08%	8	0.33%	585	24.44%	2,394
Kearney	2,621	77.57%	707	20.92%	27	0.80%	9	0.27%	4	0.12%	11	0.33%	1,914	56.64%	3,379
Keith	3,356	81.12%	743	17.96%	24	0.58%	2	0.05%	9	0.22%	3	0.07%	2,613	63.16%	4,137
Keya Paha	442	80.51%	98	17.85%	5	0.91%	2	0.36%	1	0.18%	1	0.18%	344	62.66%	549
Kimball	1,491	79.44%	366	19.50%	7	0.37%	3	0.16%	6	0.32%	4	0.21%	1,125	59.94%	1,877
Knox	3,062	72.68%	1,086	25.78%	38	0.90%	5	0.12%	16	0.38%	6	0.14%	1,976	46.90%	4,213
Lancaster	69,764	56.03%	52,747	42.36%	1,010	0.81%	324	0.26%	151	0.12%	513	0.41%	17,017	13.67%	124,509
Lincoln	11,056	68.25%	4,905	30.28%	123	0.76%	38	0.23%	36	0.22%	41	0.25%	6,151	37.97%	16,199
Logan	357	83.22%	67	15.62%	3	0.70%	1	0.23%	1	0.23%	0	0.00%	290	67.60%	429
Loup	314	81.35%	68	17.62%	3	0.78%	1	0.26%	0	0.00%	0	0.00%	246	63.73%	386
Madison	10,981	77.94%	2,934	20.82%	94	0.67%	26	0.18%	25	0.18%	29	0.21%	8,047	57.12%	14,089
McPherson	259	83.01%	49	15.71%	1	0.32%	3	0.96%	0	0.00%	0	0.00%	210	67.30%	312
Merrick	2,771	75.77%	833	22.78%	30	0.82%	5	0.14%	10	0.27%	8	0.22%	1,938	52.99%	3,657
Morrill	1,755	76.54%	495	21.59%	20	0.87%	10	0.44%	7	0.31%	6	0.26%	1,260	54.95%	2,293
Nance	1,237	71.46%	459	26.52%	19	1.10%	3	0.17%	9	0.52%	4	0.23%	778	44.95%	1,731
Nemaha	2,595	69.85%	1,066	28.69%	30	0.81%	10	0.27%	5	0.13%	9	0.24%	1,529	41.16%	3,715
Nuckolls	1,884	76.24%	541	21.89%	23	0.93%	7	0.28%	9	0.36%	7	0.28%	1,343	54.35%	2,471
Otoe	5,018	67.94%	2,275	30.80%	47	0.64%	16	0.22%	11	0.15%	19	0.26%	2,743	37.14%	7,386
Pawnee	986	66.49%	481	32.43%	5	0.34%	3	0.20%	5	0.34%	3	0.20%	505	34.05%	1,483
Perkins	1,285	82.48%	262	16.82%	5	0.32%	4	0.26%	2	0.13%	0	0.00%	1,023	65.66%	1,558
Phelps	3,872	81.64%	830	17.50%	18	0.38%	7	0.15%	10	0.21%	6	0.13%	3,042	64.14%	4,743
Pierce	2,824	83.11%	546	16.07%	14	0.41%	7	0.21%	3	0.09%	4	0.12%	2,278	67.04%	3,398
Platte	11,130	79.57%	2,657	19.00%	107	0.76%	30	0.21%	26	0.19%	37	0.26%	8,473	60.58%	13,987
Polk	2,146	78.69%	549	20.13%	21	0.77%	2	0.07%	8	0.29%	1	0.04%	1,597	58.56%	2,727
Red Willow	4,129	78.53%	1,055	20.06%	40	0.76%	14	0.27%	11	0.21%	9	0.17%	3,074	58.46%	5,258
Richardson	2,924	68.35%	1,297	30.32%	27	0.63%	9	0.21%	12	0.28%	9	0.21%	1,627	38.03%	4,278
Rock	740	83.81%	130	14.72%	8	0.91%	2	0.23%	2	0.23%	1	0.11%	610	69.08%	883
Saline	3,071	55.17%	2,420	43.48%	38	0.68%	10	0.18%	13	0.23%	14	0.25%	651	11.70%	5,566
Sarpy	40,163	68.85%	17,455	29.92%	334	0.57%	200	0.34%	65	0.11%	117	0.20%	22,708	38.93%	58,334
Saunders	6,441	67.88%	2,884	30.39%	84	0.89%	28	0.30%	23	0.24%	29	0.31%	3,557	37.49%	9,489
Scotts Bluff	10,378	72.12%	3,843	26.71%	84	0.58%	30	0.21%	27	0.19%	28	0.19%	6,535	45.41%	14,390
Seward	5,353	70.76%	2,114	27.94%	49	0.65%	11	0.15%	19	0.25%	19	0.25%	3,239	42.82%	7,565
Sheridan	2,136	82.19%	430	16.54%	16	0.62%	11	0.42%	2	0.08%	4	0.15%	1,706	65.64%	2,599
Sherman	1,072	65.25%	541	32.93%	19	1.16%	6	0.37%	4	0.24%	1	0.06%	531	32.32%	1,643
Sioux	677	83.68%	123	15.20%	4	0.49%	4	0.49%	1	0.12%	0	0.00%	554	68.48%	809
Stanton	2,159	78.65%	559	20.36%	14	0.51%	3	0.11%	5	0.18%	5	0.18%	1,600	58.29%	2,745
Thayer	2,075	72.10%	764	26.55%	18	0.63%	5	0.17%	10	0.35%	6	0.21%	1,311	45.55%	2,878
Thomas	378	85.14%	60	13.51%	4	0.90%	1	0.23%	1	0.23%	0	0.00%	318	71.62%	444
Thurston	1,154	48.35%	1,212	50.78%	14	0.59%	2	0.08%	3	0.13%	2	0.08%	-58	-2.43%	2,387
Valley	1,801	75.32%	564	23.59%	13	0.54%	3	0.13%	5	0.21%	5	0.21%	1,237	51.74%	2,391
Washington	7,083	71.19%	2,754	27.68%	53	0.53%	38	0.38%	7	0.07%	15	0.15%	4,329	43.51%	9,950
Wayne	2,971	72.73%	1,059	25.92%	24	0.59%	10	0.24%	11	0.27%	10	0.24%	1,912	46.81%	4,085
Webster	1,403	70.08%	557	27.82%	15	0.75%	4	0.20%	7	0.35%	16	0.80%	846	42.26%	2,002
Wheeler	366	80.79%	81	17.88%	5	1.10%	1	0.22%	0	0.00%	0	0.00%	285	62.91%	453
York	5,393	79.34%	1,304	19.18%	48	0.71%	14	0.21%	17	0.25%	21	0.31%	4,089	60.16%	6,797
Totals	512,814	65.90%	254,328	32.68%	5,698	0.73%	2,041	0.26%	1,314	0.17%	1,991	0.26%	258,486	33.22%	778,186

Counties that flipped from Republican to Democratic

- Thurston (largest municipality: Pender)

=== By congressional district ===
Bush won all three congressional districts.

district	Bush	Kerry	Representative
1st	63%	36%	Doug Bereuter
1st	63%	36%	Jeff Fortenberry
2nd	60%	38%	Lee Terry
3rd	75%	24%	Tom Osborne

== See also ==
- United States presidential elections in Nebraska
- Presidency of George W. Bush
