= Thurston County Courthouse =

Thurston County Courthouse may refer to:

- First Thurston County Courthouse, Pender, Nebraska
- Thurston County Courthouse (Nebraska), Pender, Nebraska
- Thurston County Courthouse (Washington), Olympia, Washington
