= Cleveland Township, Indiana =

Cleveland Township is the name of two townships in the U.S. state of Indiana:

- Cleveland Township, Elkhart County, Indiana
- Cleveland Township, Whitley County, Indiana

== See also ==
- Cleveland Township (disambiguation)
