= Thurston County Courthouse (Nebraska) =

- U.S. National Register of Historic Places
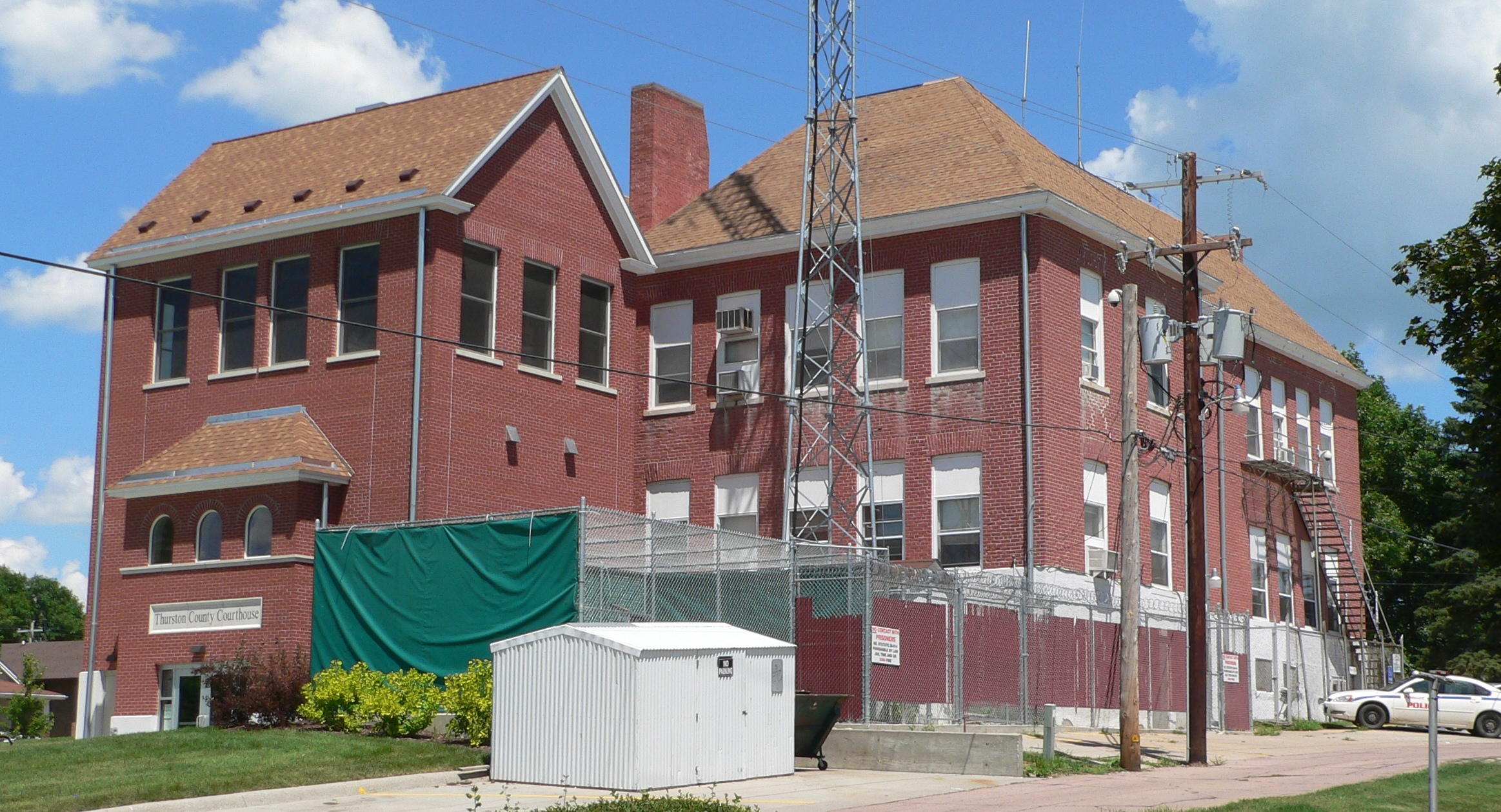
- Thurston County Courthouse, seen from the southwest. The portion at left is an addition of recent date.

- Location within Nebraska Location within the United States
- Location: Main St. between 5th and 6th Sts., Pender, Nebraska
- Coordinates: 42°6′49″N 96°42′32″W
- Built: 1895, 1927
- Architect: Reynolds, J.F. (1927 conversion)
- Architectural style: Late Victorian
- MPS: County Courthouses of Nebraska MPS
- NRHP reference No.: 89002209
- Added to NRHP: January 10, 1990

Thurston County Courthouse in Pender, Nebraska is a Late Victorian style building. It has also been known as 2nd Thurston County Courthouse and Pender School. It was built as a school in 1895 and was converted to a courthouse in 1927. Architect J.F. Reynolds of Sioux City, Iowa designed the conversion.

The 1927 conversion created permanent courthouse space adequate for the court, which was desirable to settle dispute within the county about the county seat's proper location. Pender, established in 1884, has always been the county seat of Thurston County, established in 1889, but during the early 1900s the town of Walthill struggled to obtain the seat instead. The First Thurston County Courthouse (also NRHP-listed) had inadequate space and the county leased additional space from the nearby Palace Hotel. As part of promoting a county seat change, Walthill proponents sued the county commissioners to dispute the leasing arrangement in a case that won in a lower court and then went up to the Nebraska Supreme Court, which upheld the leasing arrangement and reversed the lower court decision. Walthill also pursued a petition drive which failed after Pender advocates established that there was fraud in obtaining signatures. The controversy included other charges back and forth, and went on during 1909 and 1910.

It was listed on the National Register of Historic Places (NRHP) in 1990.

== See also ==
- First Thurston County Courthouse, Pender, Nebraska, also listed on the NRHP
