= Cuming Township, Nebraska =

Cuming Township, Nebraska may refer to the following places in Nebraska:

- Cuming Township, Cuming County, Nebraska
- Cuming Township, Dodge County, Nebraska
