= J. F. Reynolds =

American architect

John F. Reynolds, usually known as J. F. Reynolds, was an architect of Sioux City, Iowa and Lincoln, Nebraska. He designed schools and courthouses. Several of his works have been listed on the National Register of Historic Places (NRHP) for their architecture.

One of his salient works is the Perkins County Courthouse, built during 1926–27, which has been described as a "fine example" of County Citadel design, with Classical Revival architecture elements. It was designed by Reynolds to include stone pilasters that were changed to brick to reduce costs; the courthouse contract finally approved was for $126,000. It was listed on the NRHP for its architecture and its history.

From a 1933 lawsuit involving farm land in Texas, it is known that Reynolds was considering a move from Iowa to Texas in 1930–31, but failed to find professional work there.

== Projects ==
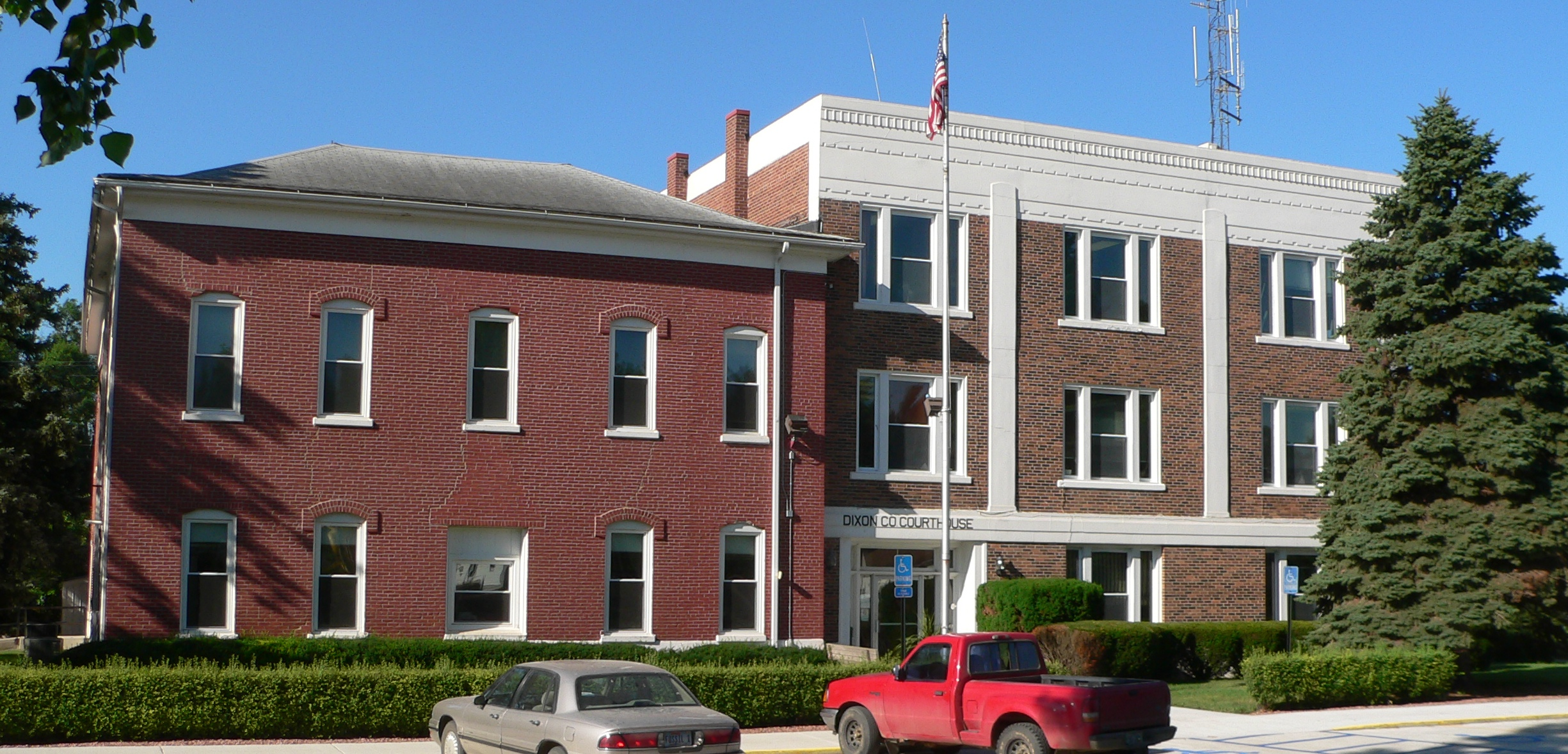
Dixon County Courthouse

Works include (with attribution):

- Belden Public School (1924), Dodge Street, Belden, Nebraska
- Perkins County Courthouse (1926–27), Lincoln St. between 2nd and 3rd Sts. Grant, Nebraska (Reynolds, J. F.), NRHP-listed
- Thurston County Courthouse (1927 conversion from school to courthouse), Main St. between 5th and 6th Sts. Pender, Nebraska (Reynolds, J. F.), NRHP-listed (? same building as Third Thurston County Public School (1927), Southside Main between 5th & 6th, Pender, Nebraska ?)
- Crookston Public School (ca. 1930), Main between Oak & 2nd, Crookston, Nebraska
- Ainsworth City Hall (1935–36), Ainsworth, Nebraska
- Hampton Auditorium (1938), Hampton, Nebraska
- Dixon County Courthouse Addition (1939–1940), 3rd and Iowa Sts., Ponca, Nebraska (Reynolds, J.), NRHP-listed

Construction of Reynolds' designs for a city hall in Ainsworth, Nebraska (1935) and for an auditorium in Hampton, Nebraska (1938) were partially funded by Public Works Administration grants, at 50% and 30% respectively.
