= Bancroft Township =

Bancroft Township may refer to:

- Bancroft, Maine, a township
- Bancroft Township, Freeborn County, Minnesota
- Bancroft Township, Cuming County, Nebraska
