= Nebraska Highway 94 =

State highway in Nebraska, U.S.

State Highway 94

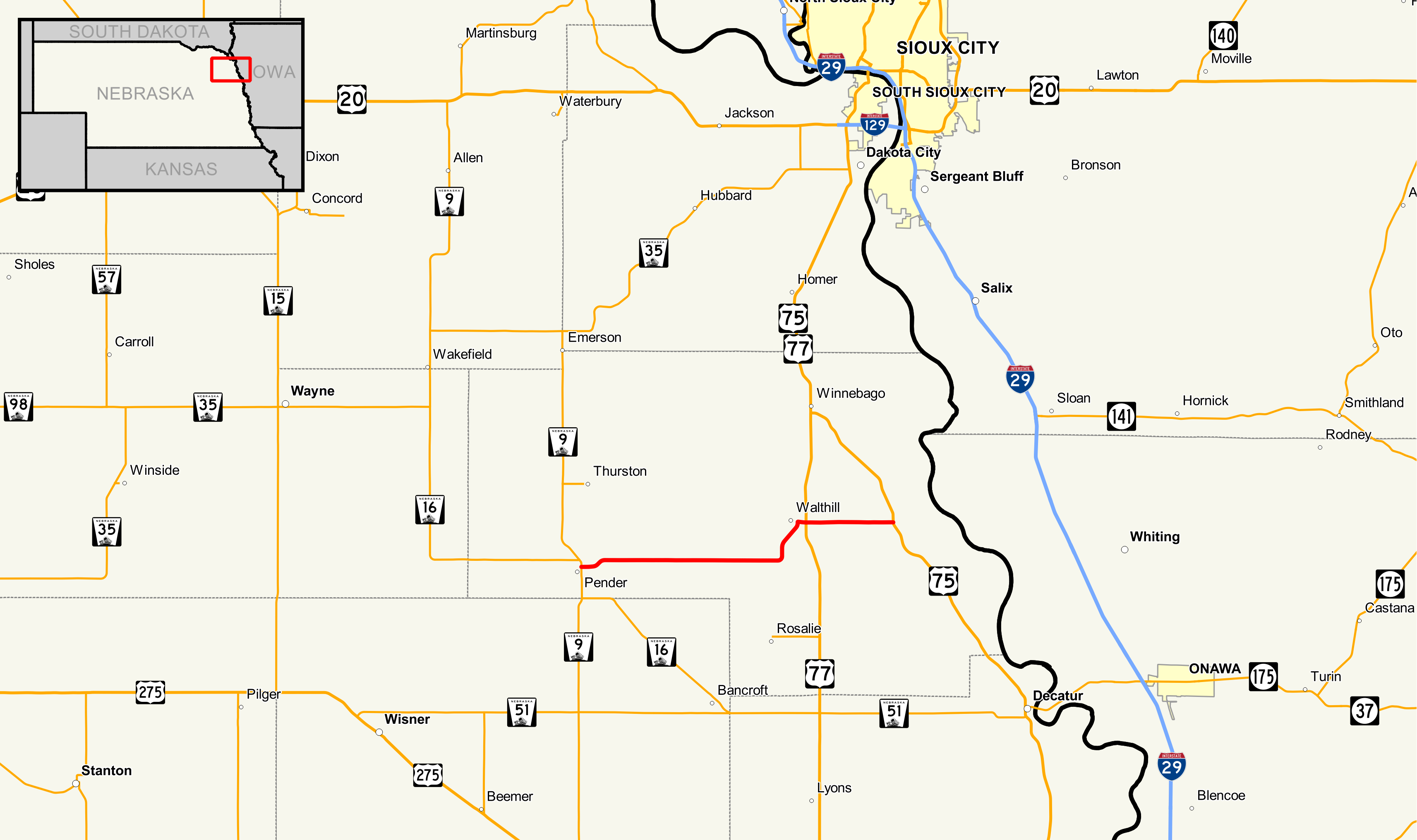
- Nebraska Highway 94 highlighted in red

Route information
- Maintained by NDOT
- Length: 17.92 mi (28.84 km)
- Existed: 1934–present

Major junctions
- West end: N-9 / N-16 in Pender
- US 77 east of Walthill
- East end: US 75 northwest of Macy

Location
- Country: United States
- State: Nebraska
- Counties: Thurston

Highway system
- Nebraska State Highway System; Interstate; US; State; Link; Spur; State Spurs; Recreation
← N-92	→ N-95

Nebraska Highway 94 is a highway in northeastern Nebraska. It has a western terminus at an intersection with Nebraska Highway 9 and Nebraska Highway 16 in Pender. Its eastern terminus is at U.S. Highway 75 to the northwest of Macy.

== Route description ==
Nebraska Highway 94 begins in Pender at an intersection with NE 9 and NE 16. The highway heads in an eastward direction through farmland, before turning to the northeast as it enters Walthill. Just outside the eastern edge of Walthill, NE 94 intersects US 77 as it resumes its eastward orientation. The highway terminates a few miles further along at US 75 northwest of Macy.

== Major intersections ==
The entire route is in Thurston County.

Location	mi	km	Destinations	Notes
Pender	0.00	0.00	N-9 / N-16 (4th Street)	Western terminus
Walthill	13.33	21.45	US 77	
Macy	17.92	28.84	US 75	Eastern terminus
1.000 mi = 1.609 km; 1.000 km = 0.621 mi
