= Dixon County Courthouse =

- U.S. National Register of Historic Places
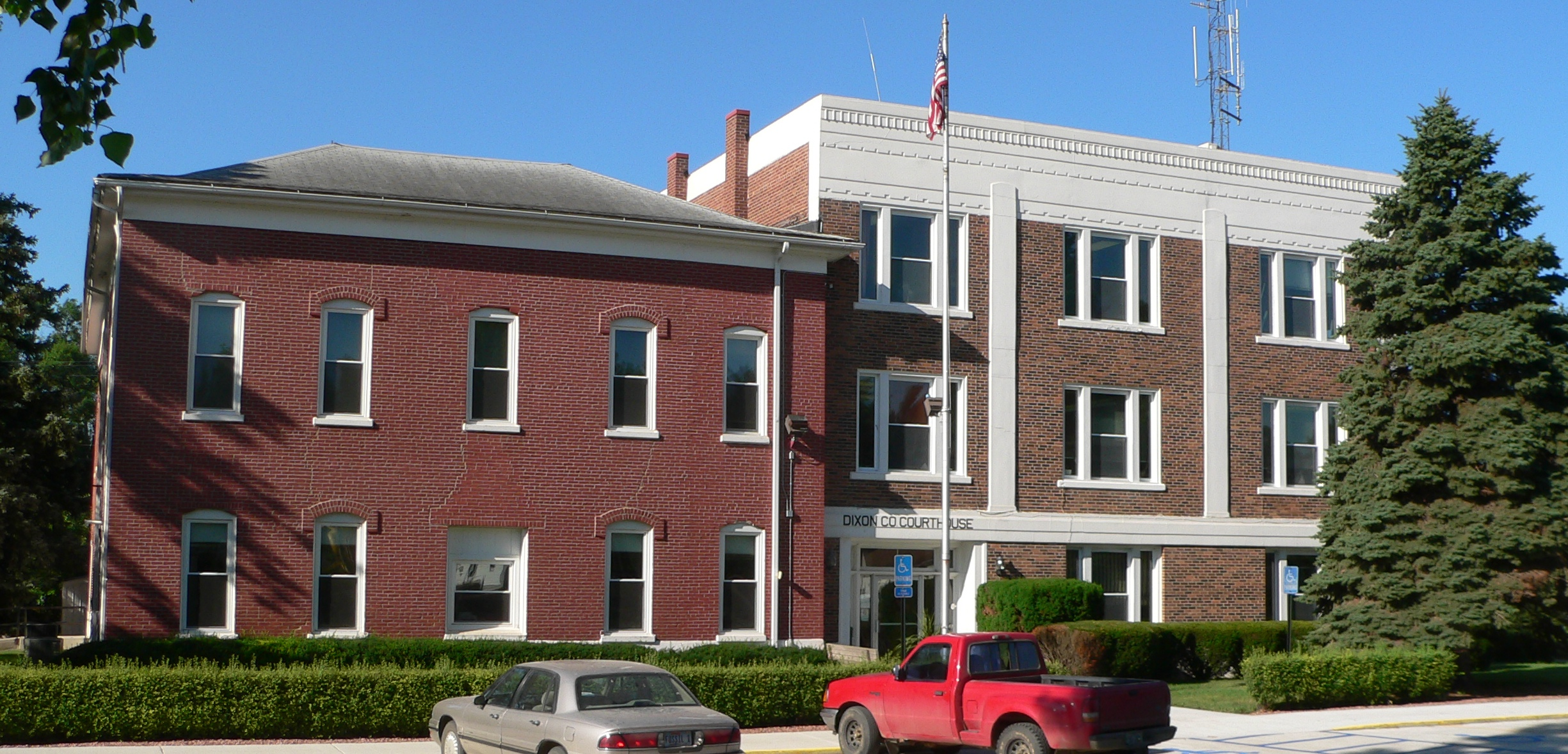

- Location within Nebraska Location within the United States
- Location: 3rd and Iowa Sts., Ponca, Nebraska
- Coordinates: 42°33′46″N 96°42′32″W
- Area: less than one acre
- Built: 1883-84, 1939-1940
- Built by: Reynolds, J.
- Architectural style: Art Deco, Italianate
- MPS: County Courthouses of Nebraska MPS
- NRHP reference No.: 89002247
- Added to NRHP: January 10, 1990

The Dixon County Courthouse in Ponca, Nebraska was built in 1883–84 and expanded in 1939–1940. It was listed on the National Register of Historic Places in 1990.

The original courthouse has elements of Italianate architecture. The addition was designed by Lincoln architect J.F. Reynolds and is in Art Deco style.

It is a contributing property in the NRHP-listed Ponca Historic District.

The construction of the addition was the last salvo in a war between Ponca and Allen, Nebraska about which town would be county seat.
