= 2000 United States presidential election in Nebraska =

- November 7, 2000

Nominee	George W. Bush	Al Gore
Party	Republican	Democratic
Home state	Texas	Tennessee
Running mate	Dick Cheney	Joe Lieberman
Electoral vote	5	0
Popular vote	433,862	231,780
Percentage	62.25%	33.25%

Bush
40–50%
50–60%
60–70%
70–80%
80–90%
President before election
Bill Clinton
Democratic
Elected President
George W. Bush
Republican

The 2000 United States presidential election in Nebraska took place on November 7, 2000, and was part of the 2000 United States presidential election. Voters chose five representatives, or electors to the Electoral College, who voted for president and vice president.

Nebraska is one of the two states (the other being Maine) to award electoral votes to the winner of each congressional district.

Texas Governor George W. Bush won the statewide vote by a 29% margin of victory, winning every county. With 62.25% of the popular vote, the state proved to be his fourth strongest state in the 2000 election after Wyoming, Idaho and Utah. Bush also won all three congressional districts, so he was awarded all five of the state's electoral votes.

As of the 2024 presidential election, this is the last time that either major party nominee won every county in Nebraska.

== General election ==
=== Polling ===
Poll source	Date(s)	Sample size	Margin of error	George W. Bush (R)	Al Gore (D)	Ralph Nader (G)	Other / undecided (Note: Calculated by taking the difference of 100% and all other candidates combined.)
Harris Insights & Analytics	November 3, 2000	1,481	—	57%	38%	4%	1%
RKM Research and Communications Inc.	October 26, 2000	1,007 (RV)	—	56%	31%	2%	11%

=== Results ===
2000 United States presidential election in Nebraska
Party	Candidate	Votes	Percentage	Electoral votes
Republican	George W. Bush	433,862	62.25%	5
Democratic	Al Gore	231,780	33.25%	0
Green	Ralph Nader	24,540	3.52%	0
Reform	Pat Buchanan	3,646	0.52%	0
Libertarian	Harry Browne	2,245	0.32%	0

==== Results by county ====
County	George W. Bush Republican		Al Gore Democratic		Various candidates Other parties		Margin		Total votes cast
County	#	%	#	%	#	%	#	%	Total votes cast
Adams	8,162	65.62%	3,686	29.63%	590	4.75%	4,476	35.99%	12,438
Antelope	2,562	76.07%	678	20.13%	128	3.80%	1,884	55.94%	3,368
Arthur	235	86.40%	26	9.56%	11	4.04%	209	76.84%	272
Banner	390	84.42%	65	14.07%	7	1.51%	325	70.35%	462
Blaine	299	85.67%	43	12.32%	7	2.01%	256	73.35%	349
Boone	2,196	76.73%	575	20.09%	91	3.18%	1,621	56.64%	2,862
Box Butte	3,208	63.04%	1,614	31.72%	267	5.24%	1,594	31.32%	5,089
Boyd	931	74.96%	265	21.34%	46	3.70%	666	53.62%	1,242
Brown	1,375	81.65%	250	14.85%	59	3.50%	1,125	66.80%	1,684
Buffalo	11,931	72.48%	3,927	23.86%	603	3.66%	8,004	48.62%	16,461
Burt	2,056	60.61%	1,223	36.06%	113	3.33%	833	24.55%	3,392
Butler	2,638	68.91%	1,028	26.85%	162	4.24%	1,610	42.06%	3,828
Cass	6,144	59.77%	3,656	35.56%	480	4.67%	2,488	24.21%	10,280
Cedar	2,989	70.02%	1,062	24.88%	218	5.10%	1,927	45.14%	4,269
Chase	1,505	80.27%	306	16.32%	64	3.41%	1,199	63.95%	1,875
Cherry	2,322	81.56%	446	15.67%	79	2.77%	1,876	65.89%	2,847
Cheyenne	3,207	76.61%	844	20.16%	135	3.23%	2,363	56.45%	4,186
Clay	2,326	72.35%	774	24.07%	115	3.58%	1,552	48.28%	3,215
Colfax	2,338	70.53%	863	26.03%	114	3.44%	1,475	44.50%	3,315
Cuming	3,232	76.68%	857	20.33%	126	2.99%	2,375	56.35%	4,215
Custer	4,245	78.41%	976	18.03%	193	3.56%	3,269	60.38%	5,414
Dakota	3,119	51.46%	2,695	44.46%	247	4.08%	424	7.00%	6,061
Dawes	2,549	70.39%	823	22.73%	249	6.88%	1,726	47.66%	3,621
Dawson	5,511	73.41%	1,740	23.18%	256	3.41%	3,771	50.23%	7,507
Deuel	783	75.80%	213	20.62%	37	3.58%	570	55.18%	1,033
Dixon	1,834	66.40%	820	29.69%	138	4.94%	1,014	36.71%	2,762
Dodge	8,871	61.30%	5,021	34.69%	580	4.01%	3,850	26.61%	14,472
Douglas	101,025	55.16%	73,347	40.05%	8,784	4.79%	27,678	15.11%	183,156
Dundy	801	79.23%	179	17.71%	31	3.06%	622	61.52%	1,011
Fillmore	2,024	67.51%	848	28.29%	126	4.20%	1,176	39.22%	2,998
Franklin	1,196	71.70%	420	25.18%	52	3.12%	776	46.52%	1,668
Frontier	1,102	79.11%	244	17.52%	47	3.37%	858	61.59%	1,393
Furnas	1,849	76.06%	534	21.97%	48	1.97%	1,315	54.09%	2,431
Gage	5,538	58.26%	3,516	36.99%	452	4.75%	2,022	21.27%	9,506
Garden	963	79.00%	203	16.65%	53	4.35%	760	62.35%	1,219
Garfield	718	74.56%	202	20.98%	43	4.46%	516	53.58%	963
Gosper	757	74.65%	228	22.49%	29	2.86%	529	52.16%	1,014
Grant	324	84.16%	49	12.73%	12	3.11%	275	71.43%	385
Greeley	839	64.05%	416	31.76%	55	4.19%	423	32.29%	1,310
Hall	11,803	63.64%	5,952	32.09%	791	4.27%	5,851	31.55%	18,546
Hamilton	3,251	72.39%	1,066	23.74%	174	3.87%	2,185	48.65%	4,491
Harlan	1,358	73.33%	438	23.65%	56	3.02%	920	49.68%	1,852
Hayes	486	85.11%	66	11.56%	19	3.33%	420	73.55%	571
Hitchcock	1,126	76.08%	312	21.08%	42	2.84%	814	55.00%	1,480
Holt	3,954	79.73%	846	17.06%	159	3.21%	3,108	62.67%	4,959
Hooker	317	77.51%	74	18.09%	18	4.40%	243	59.42%	409
Howard	1,760	62.26%	955	33.78%	112	3.96%	805	28.48%	2,827
Jefferson	2,351	61.11%	1,361	35.38%	135	3.51%	990	25.73%	3,847
Johnson	1,210	57.29%	794	37.59%	108	5.12%	416	19.70%	2,112
Kearney	2,333	74.73%	680	21.78%	109	3.49%	1,653	52.95%	3,122
Keith	2,953	76.72%	778	20.21%	118	3.07%	2,175	56.51%	3,849
Keya Paha	422	82.26%	78	15.20%	13	2.54%	344	67.06%	513
Kimball	1,379	75.77%	379	20.82%	62	3.41%	1,000	54.95%	1,820
Knox	2,784	69.98%	1,037	26.07%	157	3.95%	1,747	43.91%	3,978
Lancaster	55,514	51.82%	44,650	41.68%	6,968	6.50%	10,864	10.14%	107,132
Lincoln	9,220	61.00%	5,205	34.44%	689	4.56%	4,015	26.56%	15,114
Logan	336	81.55%	60	14.56%	16	3.89%	276	66.99%	412
Loup	284	75.13%	84	22.22%	10	2.65%	200	52.91%	378
Madison	9,636	74.97%	2,772	21.57%	445	3.46%	6,864	53.40%	12,853
McPherson	244	81.06%	48	15.95%	9	2.99%	196	65.11%	301
Merrick	2,380	71.26%	848	25.39%	112	3.35%	1,532	45.87%	3,340
Morrill	1,597	74.70%	460	21.52%	81	3.78%	1,137	53.18%	2,138
Nance	1,105	66.37%	497	29.85%	63	3.78%	608	36.52%	1,665
Nemaha	2,177	64.62%	1,063	31.55%	129	3.83%	1,114	33.07%	3,369
Nuckolls	1,701	69.63%	644	26.36%	98	4.01%	1,057	43.27%	2,443
Otoe	4,178	62.71%	2,208	33.14%	276	4.15%	1,970	29.57%	6,662
Pawnee	937	61.69%	522	34.36%	60	3.95%	415	27.33%	1,519
Perkins	1,170	80.58%	243	16.74%	39	2.68%	927	63.84%	1,452
Phelps	3,575	77.26%	934	20.19%	118	2.55%	2,641	57.07%	4,627
Pierce	2,534	78.99%	570	17.77%	104	3.24%	1,964	61.22%	3,208
Platte	9,861	76.69%	2,612	20.31%	386	3.00%	7,249	56.38%	12,859
Polk	1,925	73.67%	610	23.34%	78	2.99%	1,315	50.33%	2,613
Red Willow	3,680	73.23%	1,188	23.64%	157	3.13%	2,492	49.59%	5,025
Richardson	2,623	63.20%	1,382	33.30%	145	3.50%	1,241	29.90%	4,150
Rock	725	81.10%	141	15.77%	28	3.13%	584	65.33%	894
Saline	2,581	50.17%	2,321	45.11%	243	4.72%	260	5.06%	5,145
Sarpy	28,979	64.00%	14,637	32.33%	1,662	3.67%	14,342	31.67%	45,278
Saunders	5,688	63.77%	2,852	31.98%	379	4.25%	2,836	31.79%	8,919
Scotts Bluff	9,397	67.90%	3,937	28.45%	505	3.65%	5,460	39.45%	13,839
Seward	4,457	63.53%	2,250	32.07%	309	4.40%	2,207	31.46%	7,016
Sheridan	2,105	81.72%	392	15.22%	79	3.06%	1,713	66.50%	2,576
Sherman	1,072	62.87%	564	33.08%	69	4.05%	508	29.79%	1,705
Sioux	629	83.75%	98	13.05%	25	3.33%	531	70.70%	751
Stanton	1,895	76.23%	500	20.11%	91	3.66%	1,395	56.12%	2,486
Thayer	2,096	69.73%	821	27.31%	89	2.96%	1,275	42.42%	3,006
Thomas	329	83.29%	55	13.92%	11	2.79%	274	69.37%	395
Thurston	1,040	49.95%	924	44.38%	118	5.67%	116	5.57%	2,082
Valley	1,610	71.18%	583	25.77%	70	3.10%	1,027	45.41%	2,262
Washington	5,758	66.75%	2,550	29.56%	318	3.69%	3,208	37.19%	8,626
Wayne	2,774	70.41%	1,001	25.41%	165	4.18%	1,773	45.00%	3,940
Webster	1,302	66.94%	584	30.03%	59	3.03%	718	36.91%	1,945
Wheeler	351	77.48%	85	18.76%	17	3.76%	266	58.72%	453
York	4,816	74.55%	1,407	21.78%	237	3.67%	3,409	52.77%	6,460
Totals	433,862	62.25%	231,780	33.25%	31,377	4.50%	202,082	29.00%	697,019

===== Counties that flipped from Democratic to Republican =====
- Dakota (Largest city: South Sioux City)
- Saline (Largest city: Crete)
- Thurston (Largest city: Pender)

==== By congressional district ====
Bush won all three congressional districts.

district	Bush	Gore	Representative
1st	59%	36%	Doug Bereuter
2nd	57%	39%	Lee Terry
3rd	71%	25%	Bill Barrett (106th Congress)
3rd	71%	25%	Tom Osborne (107th Congress)

== Electors ==
The electors of each state and the District of Columbia met on December 18, 2000 to cast their votes for president and vice president. The Electoral College itself never meets as one body. Instead, the electors from each state and the District of Columbia met in their respective capitols.

The following were the members of the Electoral College from the state. All were pledged to and voted for George Bush and Dick Cheney:

1. Mary Johnson
2. Lee Terry, Sr.
3. Howard Lamb
4. Mildred Curtis
5. John Y. McCollister

== See also ==
- United States presidential elections in Nebraska
- Presidency of George W. Bush
