= Thurston, Nebraska =

Village in Thurston County, Nebraska, United States

- Village
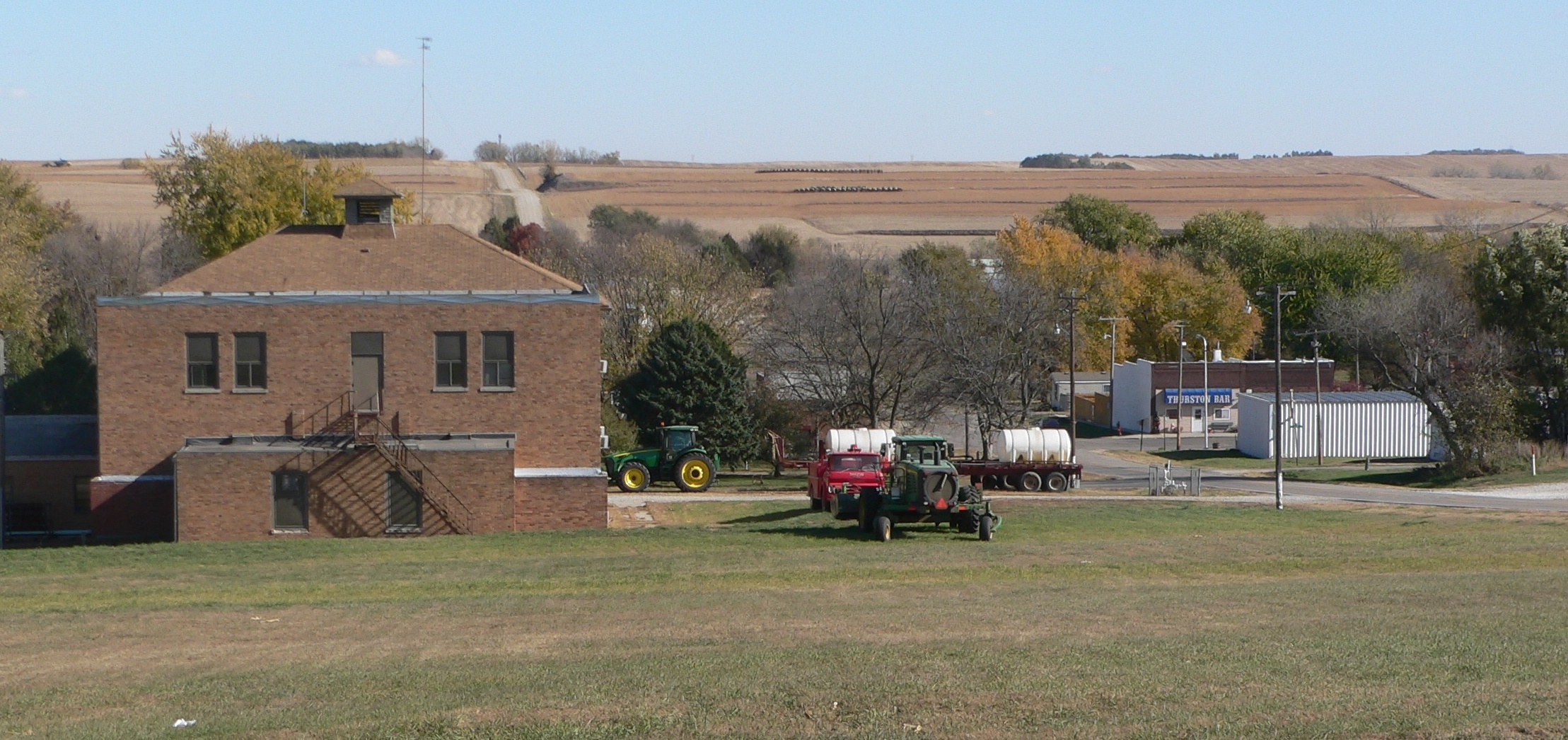
- Thurston, looking downhill from western edge of town, October 2011

- Location of Thurston, Nebraska

- Location within Nebraska Location within the United States
- Coordinates: 42°10′29″N 96°42′06″W
- Country: United States
- State: Nebraska
- County: Thurston
- Township: Flournoy

Area
  - Total: 0.28 sq mi (0.73 km^{2})
  - Land: 0.28 sq mi (0.73 km^{2})
  - Water: 0 sq mi (0.00 km^{2})
- Elevation: 1,404 ft (428 m)

Population (2020)
  - Total: 116
  - Density: 409.4/sq mi (158.08/km^{2})
- Time zone: UTC-6 (Central (CST))
  - Summer (DST): UTC-5 (CDT)
- ZIP code: 68062
- Area code: 402
- FIPS code: 31-48900
- GNIS feature ID: 2399979

Thurston is a village in Thurston County, Nebraska, United States. As of the 2020 census, Thurston had a population of 116.

== History ==
The first settlement at Thurston was made in the 1880s. Like Thurston County, it was named for John M. Thurston.

== Geography ==
According to the United States Census Bureau, the village has a total area of 0.12 square miles (0.31 km^{2}), all land.

== Demographics ==
Historical population
Census	Pop.	Note	%±
1910	112		—
1920	204		82.1%
1930	236		15.7%
1940	221		−6.4%
1950	156		−29.4%
1960	140		−10.3%
1970	117		−16.4%
1980	139		18.8%
1990	98		−29.5%
2000	125		27.6%
2010	132		5.6%
2020	116		−12.1%
U.S. Decennial Census

=== 2010 census ===
As of the census of 2010, there were 132 people, 50 households, and 37 families living in the village. The population density was 1,100.0 inhabitants per square mile (424.7/km^{2}). There were 54 housing units at an average density of 450.0 per square mile (173.7/km^{2}). The racial makeup of the village was 100% White.

There were 50 households, of which 40% had children under the age of 18 living with them, 58% were married couples living together, 10% had a female householder with no husband present, 6% had a male householder with no wife present, and 26% were non-families. 24% of all households were made up of individuals, and 12% had someone living alone who was 65 years of age or older. The average household size was 2.64 and the average family size was 3.05.

The median age in the village was 31.4 years. 35.6% of residents were under the age of 18; 4.6% were between the ages of 18 and 24; 25.8% were from 25 to 44; 21.2% were from 45 to 64; and 12.9% were 65 years of age or older. The gender makeup of the village was 53.8% male and 46.2% female.

=== 2000 census ===
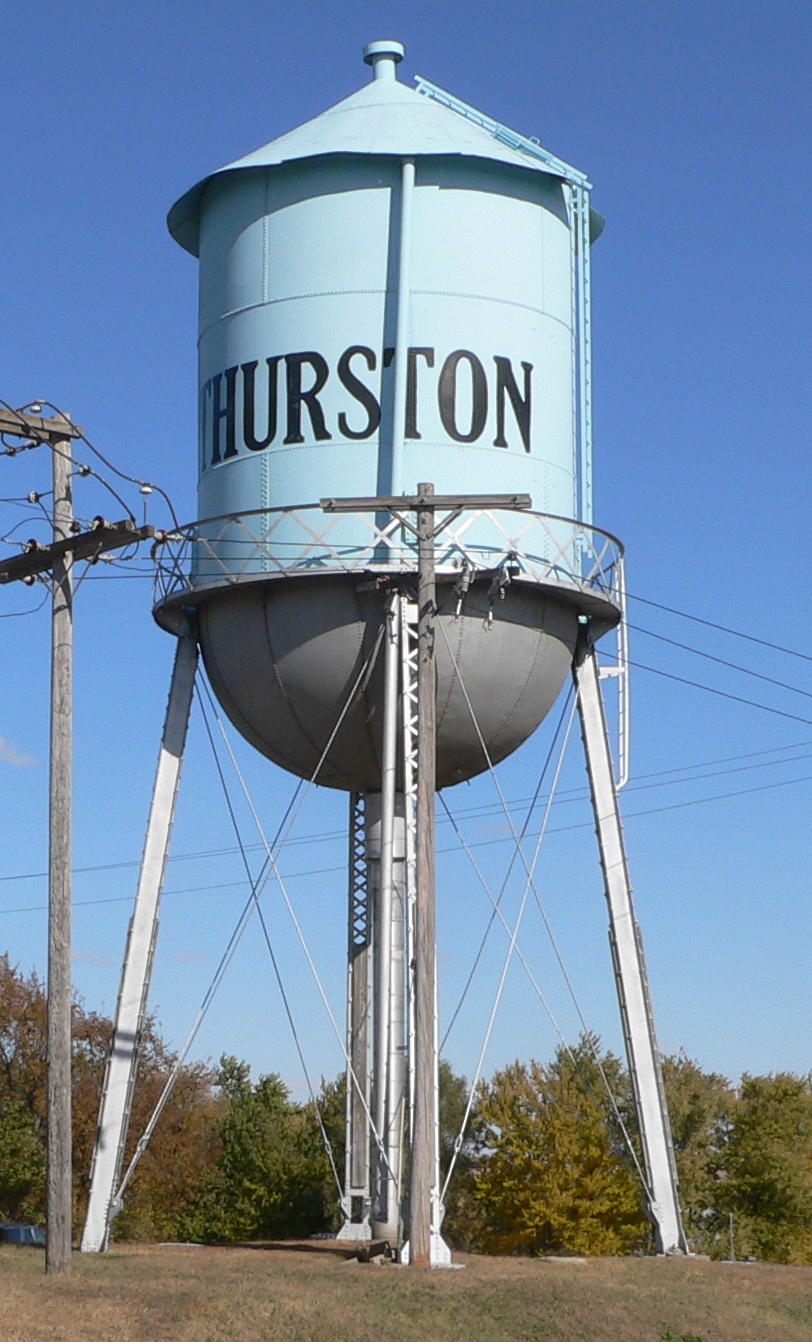
Thurston water tower, October 2011

As of the census of 2000, there were 125 people, 51 households, and 36 families living in the village. The population density was 1,089.7 inhabitants per square mile (420.7/km^{2}). There were 54 housing units at an average density of 470.8 per square mile (181.8/km^{2}). The racial makeup of the village was 96.80% White, 1.60% from other races, and 1.60% from two or more races. Hispanic or Latino of any race were 1.60% of the population.

There were 51 households, out of which 31.4% had children under the age of 18 living with them, 68.6% were married couples living together, and 29.4% were non-families. 21.6% of all households were made up of individuals, and 11.8% had someone living alone who was 65 years of age or older. The average household size was 2.45 and the average family size was 2.92.

In the village, the population was spread out, with 23.2% under the age of 18, 10.4% from 18 to 24, 31.2% from 25 to 44, 16.8% from 45 to 64, and 18.4% who were 65 years of age or older. The median age was 36 years. For every 100 females, there were 95.3 males. For every 100 females age 18 and over, there were 108.7 males.

As of 2000 the median income for a household in the village was $26,875, and the median income for a family was $41,875. Males had a median income of $28,500 versus $17,083 for females. The per capita income for the village was $12,547. There were 3.4% of the families and 5.9% of the population living below the poverty line, including no one under the age of 18 and 5.6% of those over 64.

== Education ==
The local school district is Pender Public Schools.

== See also ==
- List of municipalities in Nebraska
