= St. Charles Township, Cuming County, Nebraska =

St. Charles Township
- Township
- Location in Cuming County
- Coordinates: 41°48′36″N 096°45′30″W
- Country: United States
- State: Nebraska
- County: Cuming

Area
  - Total: 29.67 sq mi (76.85 km^{2})
  - Land: 28.99 sq mi (75.08 km^{2})
  - Water: 0.68 sq mi (1.77 km^{2}) 2.3%
- Elevation: 1,355 ft (413 m)

Population (2020)
  - Total: 185
  - Density: 6.38/sq mi (2.46/km^{2})
- ZIP code: 68788
- Area codes: 402 and 531
- GNIS feature ID: 0838224

St. Charles Township is one of sixteen townships in Cuming County, Nebraska, United States. The population was 185 at the 2020 census. A 2021 estimate placed the township's population at 183.

== See also ==
- County government in Nebraska
