= Sherman Township, Cuming County, Nebraska =

Sherman Township
- Township
- Location in Cuming County
- Coordinates: 41°50′39″N 096°42′58″W
- Country: United States
- State: Nebraska
- County: Cuming

Area
  - Total: 40.03 sq mi (103.69 km^{2})
  - Land: 39.3 sq mi (101.9 km^{2})
  - Water: 0.69 sq mi (1.78 km^{2}) 1.72%
- Elevation: 1,306 ft (398 m)

Population (2020)
  - Total: 569
  - Density: 14.5/sq mi (5.58/km^{2})
- GNIS feature ID: 0838247

Sherman Township is one of sixteen townships in Cuming County, Nebraska, United States. The population was 569 at the 2020 census. A 2021 estimate placed the township's population at 566.

== See also ==
- County government in Nebraska
