= First Thurston County Courthouse =

- U.S. National Register of Historic Places
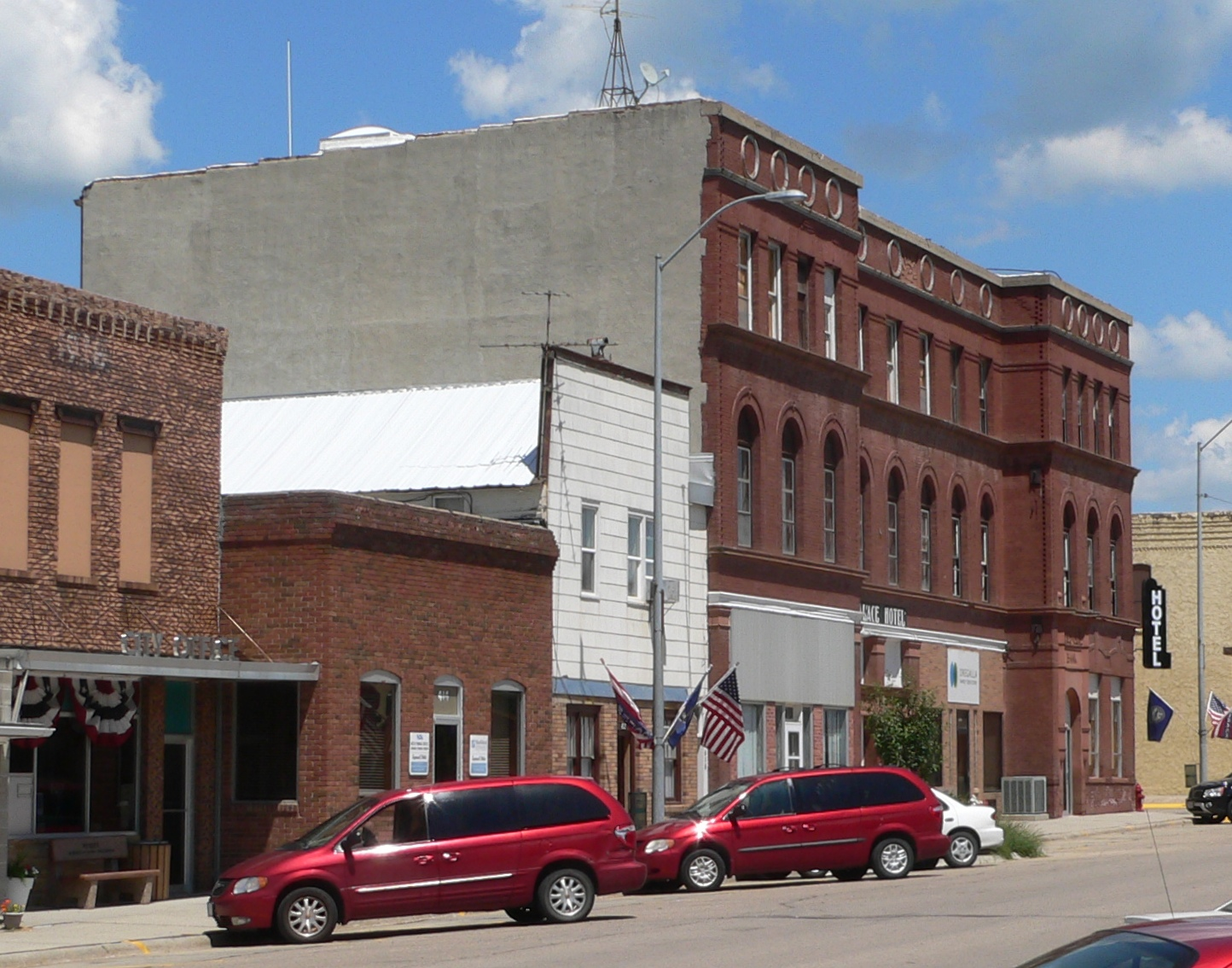

- Location within Nebraska Location within the United States
- Location: 400-412 Main St., Pender, Nebraska
- Coordinates: 42°6′51″N 96°42′26″W
- Area: less than one acre
- Architectural style: Renaissance, Second Renaissance Revival
- MPS: County Courthouses of Nebraska MPS
- NRHP reference No.: 89002210
- Added to NRHP: January 10, 1990

The First Thurston County Courthouse, in Pender, Nebraska, was listed on the National Register of Historic Places in 1990. It consists of two contributing buildings.

The older building, at 222 Main Street, was built by 1889 and after purchase by the county for $1500 served as courthouse for Thurston County. It is a two-story wood frame commercial building about 20 feet (6.1 m) by 50 feet (15 m) in plan.

The second building, adjacent, was built in 1892 as a U-shaped hotel building known as Peebles House. It is a 100 feet (30 m) by 95 feet (29 m) three-story brick-faced U-shaped building which has aspects of the Second Renaissance Revival architecture.
