= Monterey Township, Cuming County, Nebraska =

Monterey Township
- Township
- Location in Cuming County
- Coordinates: 41°47′12″N 096°50′29″W
- Country: United States
- State: Nebraska
- County: Cuming

Area
  - Total: 36.07 sq mi (93.42 km^{2})
  - Land: 36.07 sq mi (93.42 km^{2})
  - Water: 0 sq mi (0 km^{2}) 0%
- Elevation: 1,362 ft (415 m)

Population (2020)
  - Total: 192
  - Density: 5.32/sq mi (2.06/km^{2})
- GNIS feature ID: 0838144

Monterey Township is one of sixteen townships in Cuming County, Nebraska, United States. The population was 192 at the 2020 census. A 2021 estimate placed the township's population at 190.

Its name commemorates the Battle of Monterrey in the Mexican–American War.

== See also ==
- County government in Nebraska
