= Cleveland Township =

Cleveland Township may refer to:

== Arkansas ==
- Cleveland Township, Fulton County, Arkansas, in Fulton County, Arkansas
- Cleveland Township, Little River County, Arkansas, in Little River County, Arkansas
- Cleveland Township, Lonoke County, Arkansas, in Lonoke County, Arkansas
- Cleveland Township, Miller County, Arkansas, in Miller County, Arkansas
- Cleveland Township, Ouachita County, Arkansas, in Ouachita County, Arkansas
- Cleveland Township, Phillips County, Arkansas, in Phillips County, Arkansas
- Cleveland Township, White County, Arkansas, in White County, Arkansas

== Indiana ==
- Cleveland Township, Elkhart County, Indiana
- Cleveland Township, Whitley County, Indiana

== Iowa ==
- Cleveland Township, Davis County, Iowa
- Cleveland Township, Lyon County, Iowa

== Kansas ==
- Cleveland Township, Barton County, Kansas
- Cleveland Township, Marshall County, Kansas, in Marshall County, Kansas
- Cleveland Township, Stafford County, Kansas, in Stafford County, Kansas

== Michigan ==
- Cleveland Township, Michigan

== Minnesota ==
- Cleveland Township, Minnesota

== Missouri ==
- Cleveland Township, Callaway County, Missouri

== Nebraska ==
- Cleveland Township, Cuming County, Nebraska
- Cleveland Township, Holt County, Nebraska
- Cleveland Township, Knox County, Nebraska

== North Carolina ==
- Cleveland Township, Johnston County, North Carolina, in Johnston County, North Carolina
- Cleveland Township, Rowan County, North Carolina

== North Dakota ==
- Cleveland Township, Walsh County, North Dakota

== Pennsylvania ==
- Cleveland Township, Pennsylvania

== South Dakota ==
- Cleveland Township, Brule County, South Dakota, in Brule County, South Dakota
- Cleveland Township, Edmunds County, South Dakota, in Edmunds County, South Dakota
- Cleveland Township, Hamlin County, South Dakota, in Hamlin County, South Dakota
