= Neligh Township, Cuming County, Nebraska =

Neligh Township
- Township
- Location in Cuming County
- Coordinates: 41°57′28″N 096°36′30″W
- Country: United States
- State: Nebraska
- County: Cuming

Area
  - Total: 35.80 sq mi (92.73 km^{2})
  - Land: 35.80 sq mi (92.73 km^{2})
  - Water: 0 sq mi (0 km^{2}) 0%
- Elevation: 1,440 ft (440 m)

Population (2020)
  - Total: 180
  - Density: 5.0/sq mi (1.9/km^{2})
- GNIS feature ID: 0838153

Neligh Township is one of sixteen townships in Cuming County, Nebraska, United States. The population was 180 at the 2020 census. A 2021 estimate placed the township's population at 178.

== See also ==
- County government in Nebraska
