= Lincoln Township, Cuming County, Nebraska =

Lincoln Township
- Township
- Location in Cuming County
- Coordinates: 41°47′10″N 096°57′31″W
- Country: United States
- State: Nebraska
- County: Cuming

Area
  - Total: 35.99 sq mi (93.21 km^{2})
  - Land: 35.99 sq mi (93.21 km^{2})
  - Water: 0 sq mi (0 km^{2}) 0%
- Elevation: 1,510 ft (460 m)

Population (2020)
  - Total: 198
  - Density: 5.50/sq mi (2.12/km^{2})
- GNIS feature ID: 0838092

Lincoln Township is one of sixteen townships in Cuming County, Nebraska, United States. The population was 198 at the 2020 census. A 2021 estimate placed the township's population at 199.

== See also ==
- County government in Nebraska
