= Cuming County, Nebraska =

County in Nebraska, United States

- County
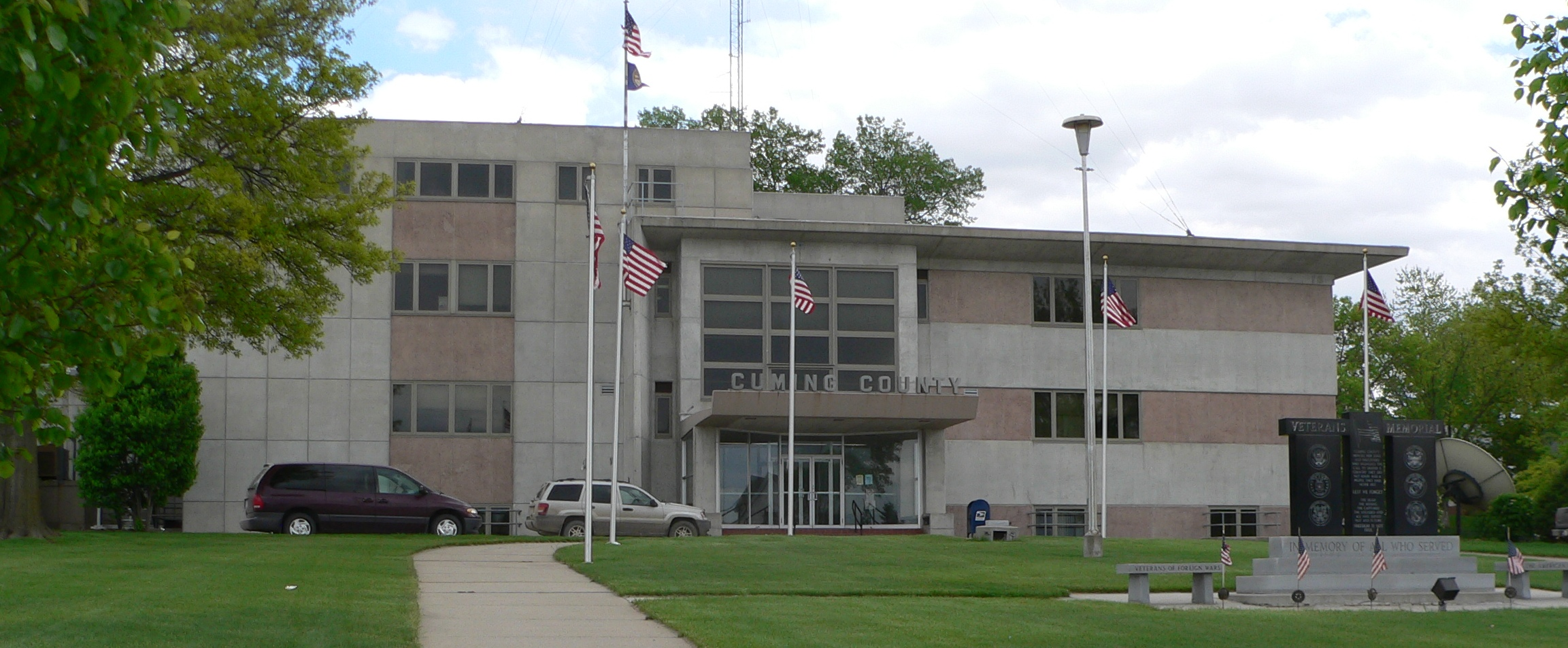
- Cuming County Courthouse in West Point

- Flag

- Location within the U.S. state of Nebraska
- Coordinates: 41°55′N 96°47′W
- Country: United States
- State: Nebraska
- Founded: 1855 (authorized); 1857 (organized)
- Named for: Thomas B. Cuming
- Seat: West Point
- Largest city: West Point

Area
  - Total: 575 sq mi (1,490 km^{2})
  - Land: 571 sq mi (1,480 km^{2})
  - Water: 4.0 sq mi (10 km^{2}) 0.7%

Population (2020)
  - Total: 9,013
  - Estimate (2025): 8,823 ▼
  - Density: 16/sq mi (6.2/km^{2})
- Time zone: UTC−6 (Central)
  - Summer (DST): UTC−5 (CDT)
- Congressional district: 1st
- Website: cumingcountyne.gov

Cuming County is a county in the U.S. state of Nebraska. As of the 2020 United States census, the population was 9,013. Its county seat is West Point. In the Nebraska license plate system, Cuming County is represented by the prefix 24 since it had the 24th largest number of vehicles registered in the state when the license plate system was established in 1922.

== History ==
Cuming County was formed in 1855 and organized in 1857. It was named for Thomas B. Cuming, the first secretary (and twice Acting Governor) of the newly created Nebraska Territory (1854–1858).

The courthouse dates from the 1950s.

On August 26, 2019, the DHHS announced that West Point's water was unsafe to drink after a year of complaints from citizens of the town. The maximum safe level of manganese for infants had been exceeded by over 700 micrograms per mL.

== Geography ==
According to the US Census Bureau, the county has an area of 575 square miles (1,490 km^{2}), of which 571 square miles (1,480 km^{2}) is land and 4.0 square miles (10 km^{2}) (0.7%) is water.

=== Major highways ===
- U.S. Highway 275
- Nebraska Highway 9
- Nebraska Highway 15
- Nebraska Highway 16
- Nebraska Highway 32
- Nebraska Highway 51

=== Adjacent counties ===
- Thurston County – northeast
- Burt County – east
- Dodge County – south
- Colfax County – southwest
- Stanton County – west
- Wayne County – northwest

== Demographics ==
Historical population
Census	Pop.	Note	%±
1860	67		—
1870	2,964		4,323.9%
1880	5,569		87.9%
1890	12,265		120.2%
1900	14,584		18.9%
1910	13,782		−5.5%
1920	13,769		−0.1%
1930	14,327		4.1%
1940	13,562		−5.3%
1950	12,994		−4.2%
1960	12,435		−4.3%
1970	12,034		−3.2%
1980	11,664		−3.1%
1990	10,117		−13.3%
2000	10,203		0.9%
2010	9,139		−10.4%
2020	9,013		−1.4%
2025 (est.)	8,823	▼	−2.1%
US Decennial Census; 1790-1960 1900-1990; 1990-2000 2010

=== 2020 census ===
As of the 2020 census, the county had a population of 9,013. The median age was 41.7 years. 24.6% of residents were under the age of 18 and 21.2% of residents were 65 years of age or older. For every 100 females there were 100.5 males, and for every 100 females age 18 and over there were 101.7 males age 18 and over.

The racial makeup of the county was 87.0% White, 0.3% Black or African American, 0.8% American Indian and Alaska Native, 0.2% Asian, 0.1% Native Hawaiian and Pacific Islander, 6.9% from some other race, and 4.8% from two or more races. Hispanic or Latino residents of any race comprised 12.3% of the population.

0.0% of residents lived in urban areas, while 100.0% lived in rural areas.

There were 3,668 households in the county, of which 29.1% had children under the age of 18 living with them and 19.6% had a female householder with no spouse or partner present. About 29.5% of all households were made up of individuals and 14.3% had someone living alone who was 65 years of age or older.

There were 4,123 housing units, of which 11.0% were vacant. Among occupied housing units, 71.3% were owner-occupied and 28.7% were renter-occupied. The homeowner vacancy rate was 1.3% and the rental vacancy rate was 13.7%.

=== 2000 census ===
As of the 2000 United States census, there were 10,203 people, 3,945 households, and 2,757 families in the county. The population density was 18 people per square mile (6.9 people/km^{2}). There were 4,283 housing units at an average density of 8 units per square mile (3.1/km^{2}).

The racial makeup of the county was 95.88% White, 0.13% Black or African American, 0.28% Native American, 0.20% Asian, 0.03% Pacific Islander, 2.63% from other races, and 0.85% from two or more races. 5.48% of the population were Hispanic or Latino of any race. 67.4% were of German and 5.6% American ancestry.

There were 3,945 households, out of which 32.60% had children under the age of 18 living with them, 61.70% were married couples living together, 5.30% had a female householder with no husband present, and 30.10% were non-families. 27.10% of all households were made up of individuals, and 14.90% had someone living alone who was 65 years of age or older. The average household size was 2.53 and the average family size was 3.08.

The county population contained 27.20% under the age of 18, 6.50% from 18 to 24, 25.20% from 25 to 44, 20.90% from 45 to 64, and 20.20% who were 65 years of age or older. The median age was 39 years. For every 100 females there were 102.10 males. For every 100 females age 18 and over, there were 99.20 males.

The median income for a household in the county was $33,186, and the median income for a family was $38,369. Males had a median income of $26,577 versus $19,246 for females. The per capita income for the county was $16,443. About 7.00% of families and 9.00% of the population were below the poverty line, including 9.80% of those under age 18 and 7.80% of those age 65 or over.

== Communities ==
=== Cities ===
- West Point (county seat)
- Wisner

=== Villages ===
- Bancroft
- Beemer

=== Unincorporated community ===
- Aloys

=== Townships ===
- Bancroft
- Beemer
- Bismark
- Blaine
- Cleveland
- Cuming
- Elkhorn
- Garfield
- Grant
- Lincoln
- Logan
- Monterey
- Neligh
- St. Charles
- Sherman
- Wisner

== Education ==
School districts include:

- Bancroft-Rosalie Community Schools
- Howells-Dodge Consolidated Schools
- Logan View Public Schools
- Lyons-Decatur Northeast Schools
- Oakland Craig Public Schools
- Pender Public Schools
- Scribner-Snyder Community Schools
- West Point Public Schools
- Wisner-Pilger Public Schools

== Politics ==
Cuming County voters are reliably Republican. In no national election since 1936 has the county selected the Democratic Party candidate (as of 2024).

United States presidential election results for Cuming County, Nebraska
Year	Republican		Democratic		Third party(ies)	
Year	No.	%	No.	%	No.	%
1880	598	50.17%	537	45.05%	57	4.78%
1884	871	48.28%	921	51.05%	12	0.67%
1888	1,038	41.99%	1,316	53.24%	118	4.77%
1892	844	33.98%	578	23.27%	1,062	42.75%
1896	1,312	42.34%	1,760	56.79%	27	0.87%
1900	1,385	43.84%	1,736	54.95%	38	1.20%
1904	1,490	52.69%	1,244	43.99%	94	3.32%
1908	1,284	42.24%	1,722	56.64%	34	1.12%
1912	759	27.53%	1,484	53.83%	514	18.64%
1916	1,551	51.04%	1,424	46.86%	64	2.11%
1920	3,177	78.64%	764	18.91%	99	2.45%
1924	1,642	36.71%	981	21.93%	1,850	41.36%
1928	2,418	47.95%	2,597	51.50%	28	0.56%
1932	1,191	21.12%	4,391	77.87%	57	1.01%
1936	2,275	38.96%	3,114	53.32%	451	7.72%
1940	4,383	73.32%	1,595	26.68%	0	0.00%
1944	4,008	74.10%	1,401	25.90%	0	0.00%
1948	2,930	63.88%	1,657	36.12%	0	0.00%
1952	4,557	80.63%	1,095	19.37%	0	0.00%
1956	4,223	76.43%	1,302	23.57%	0	0.00%
1960	3,894	67.45%	1,879	32.55%	0	0.00%
1964	3,064	57.50%	2,265	42.50%	0	0.00%
1968	3,254	72.55%	935	20.85%	296	6.60%
1972	3,810	78.90%	1,019	21.10%	0	0.00%
1976	3,303	69.19%	1,374	28.78%	97	2.03%
1980	4,006	78.07%	803	15.65%	322	6.28%
1984	3,931	82.93%	779	16.43%	30	0.63%
1988	3,208	71.75%	1,239	27.71%	24	0.54%
1992	2,713	57.10%	836	17.60%	1,202	25.30%
1996	2,520	61.60%	1,033	25.25%	538	13.15%
2000	3,232	76.68%	857	20.33%	126	2.99%
2004	3,330	76.57%	966	22.21%	53	1.22%
2008	2,732	66.85%	1,274	31.17%	81	1.98%
2012	2,876	72.33%	1,031	25.93%	69	1.74%
2016	3,122	76.63%	719	17.65%	233	5.72%
2020	3,507	78.65%	870	19.51%	82	1.84%
2024	3,536	79.34%	867	19.45%	54	1.21%

== See also ==
- National Register of Historic Places listings in Cuming County, Nebraska
