= Pender Township, Thurston County, Nebraska =

Pender Township
- Township
- Location in Thurston County
- Coordinates: 42°07′59″N 096°41′10″W
- Country: United States
- State: Nebraska
- County: Thurston

Area
  - Total: 30.16 sq mi (78.11 km^{2})
  - Land: 30.14 sq mi (78.07 km^{2})
  - Water: 0.015 sq mi (0.04 km^{2}) 0.05%
- Elevation: 1,375 ft (419 m)

Population (2020)
  - Total: 1,242
  - Density: 41.20/sq mi (15.91/km^{2})
- ZIP code: 68047
- Area codes: 402 and 531
- GNIS feature ID: 0838184

Pender Township is one of eleven townships in Thurston County, Nebraska, United States. The population was 1,242 at the 2020 census.

The village of Pender lies within the southwestern part of township. Nebraska Highway 9 and Nebraska Highway 16 both pass through the township, and Nebraska Highway 94 has its western terminus in the village of Pender. Logan Creek (also known as Logan Creek Dredge) also runs through the township.

== See also ==
- List of Nebraska townships
- County government in Nebraska
