= Bismark Township, Cuming County, Nebraska =

Bismark Township
- Township
- Location in Cuming County
- Coordinates: 41°52′24″N 096°57′38″W
- Country: United States
- State: Nebraska
- County: Cuming

Area
  - Total: 35.94 sq mi (93.08 km^{2})
  - Land: 35.94 sq mi (93.08 km^{2})
  - Water: 0 sq mi (0 km^{2}) 0%
- Elevation: 1,516 ft (462 m)

Population (2020)
  - Total: 147
  - Density: 4.09/sq mi (1.58/km^{2})
- GNIS feature ID: 0837878

Bismark Township is one of sixteen townships in Cuming County, Nebraska, United States. The population was 147 at the 2020 census. A 2021 estimate placed the township's population at 146.

It was named for Otto von Bismarck.

== See also ==
- County government in Nebraska
