= Aloys, Nebraska =

Unincorporated community in Nebraska, United States

- Unincorporated community
- Location within Nebraska Location within the United States
- Coordinates: 41°49′46″N 96°54′12″W
- Country: United States
- State: Nebraska
- County: Cuming

Aloys is an unincorporated community in Cuming County, Nebraska, United States.

== History ==
A post office was established at Aloys in 1895, and remained in operation until 1902.
