= Merry Township, Thurston County, Nebraska =

Merry Township
- Township
- Location in Thurston County
- Coordinates: 42°13′26″N 096°35′50″W
- Country: United States
- State: Nebraska
- County: Thurston

Area
  - Total: 31.4 sq mi (81.3 km^{2})
  - Land: 31.4 sq mi (81.3 km^{2})
  - Water: 0 sq mi (0 km^{2}) 0%
- Elevation: 1,463 ft (446 m)

Population (2020)
  - Total: 68
  - Density: 2.2/sq mi (0.84/km^{2})
- GNIS feature ID: 0838135

Merry Township is one of eleven townships in Thurston County, Nebraska, United States. The population was 68 at the 2020 census.

== See also ==
- County government in Nebraska
