= Flournoy Township, Thurston County, Nebraska =

Flournoy Township
- Township
- Location in Thurston County
- Coordinates: 42°12′06″N 096°42′49″W
- Country: United States
- State: Nebraska
- County: Thurston

Area
  - Total: 35.88 sq mi (92.93 km^{2})
  - Land: 35.79 sq mi (92.69 km^{2})
  - Water: 0.093 sq mi (0.24 km^{2}) 0%
- Elevation: 1,450 ft (442 m)

Population (2020)
  - Total: 272
  - Density: 7.60/sq mi (2.93/km^{2})
- GNIS feature ID: 0838004

Flournoy Township is one of eleven townships in Thurston County, Nebraska, United States. The population was 272 at the 2020 census.

The Village of Thurston lies within the Township.
