= Perry Township, Thurston County, Nebraska =

- Location in Thurston County
- Coordinates: 42°14′23″N 096°42′59″W
- Country: United States
- State: Nebraska
- County: Thurston

Area
  - Total: 34.60 sq mi (89.62 km^{2})
  - Land: 34.60 sq mi (89.62 km^{2})
  - Water: 0 sq mi (0 km^{2}) 0%
- Elevation: 1,427 ft (435 m)

Population (2020)
  - Total: 235
  - Density: 6.79/sq mi (2.62/km^{2})
- GNIS feature ID: 0838186

Perry Township is one of eleven townships in Thurston County, Nebraska, United States. The population was 235 at the 2020 census.

A portion of the Village of Emerson lies within the Township.

== See also ==
- County government in Nebraska
