= Blackbird Township, Thurston County, Nebraska =

Blackbird Township
- Township
- Location in Thurston County
- Coordinates: 42°08′43″N 096°21′12″W
- Country: United States
- State: Nebraska
- County: Thurston

Area
  - Total: 27.06 sq mi (70.09 km^{2})
  - Land: 26.21 sq mi (67.89 km^{2})
  - Water: 0.85 sq mi (2.2 km^{2}) 3.14%
- Elevation: 1,112 ft (339 m)

Population (2020)
  - Total: 1,268
  - Density: 48.37/sq mi (18.68/km^{2})
- GNIS feature ID: 0837880

Blackbird Township is one of eleven townships in Thurston County, Nebraska, United States. The population was 1,268 at the 2020 census.

== See also ==
- County government in Nebraska
