= Cuming Township, Cuming County, Nebraska =

Cuming Township
- Township
- Location in Cuming County
- Coordinates: 41°47′12″N 096°36′58″W
- Country: United States
- State: Nebraska
- County: Cuming

Area
  - Total: 36.02 sq mi (93.29 km^{2})
  - Land: 36.02 sq mi (93.29 km^{2})
  - Water: 0 sq mi (0 km^{2}) 0%
- Elevation: 1,322 ft (403 m)

Population (2020)
  - Total: 193
  - Density: 5.36/sq mi (2.07/km^{2})
- GNIS feature ID: 0837951

Cuming Township is one of sixteen townships in Cuming County, Nebraska, United States. The population was 193 at the 2020 census. A 2021 estimate placed the township's population at 191.

== See also ==
- County government in Nebraska
