= Thayer Township, Thurston County, Nebraska =

Thayer Township
- Township
- Location in Thurston County
- Coordinates: 42°07′59″N 096°46′56″W
- Country: United States
- State: Nebraska
- County: Thurston

Area
  - Total: 23.95 sq mi (62.03 km^{2})
  - Land: 23.95 sq mi (62.03 km^{2})
  - Water: 0 sq mi (0 km^{2}) 0%
- Elevation: 1,381 ft (421 m)

Population (2020)
  - Total: 111
  - Density: 4.63/sq mi (1.79/km^{2})
- ZIP code: 68047
- Area codes: 402 and 531
- GNIS feature ID: 0838281

Thayer Township is one of eleven townships in Thurston County, Nebraska, United States. The population was 111 at the 2020 census.

== See also ==
- County government in Nebraska
