= Bryan Township, Thurston County, Nebraska =

Bryan Township
- Township
- Location in Thurston County
- Coordinates: 42°07′35″N 096°34′48″W
- Country: United States
- State: Nebraska
- County: Thurston

Area
  - Total: 20.40 sq mi (52.83 km^{2})
  - Land: 20.40 sq mi (52.83 km^{2})
  - Water: 0 sq mi (0 km^{2}) 0%
- Elevation: 1,470 ft (448 m)

Population (2020)
  - Total: 89
  - Density: 4.4/sq mi (1.7/km^{2})
- GNIS feature ID: 0837895

Bryan Township is one of eleven townships in Thurston County, Nebraska, United States. The population was 110 at the 2020 census.
