= Macy, Nebraska =

Census-designated place in Thurston County, Nebraska, United States

- CDP
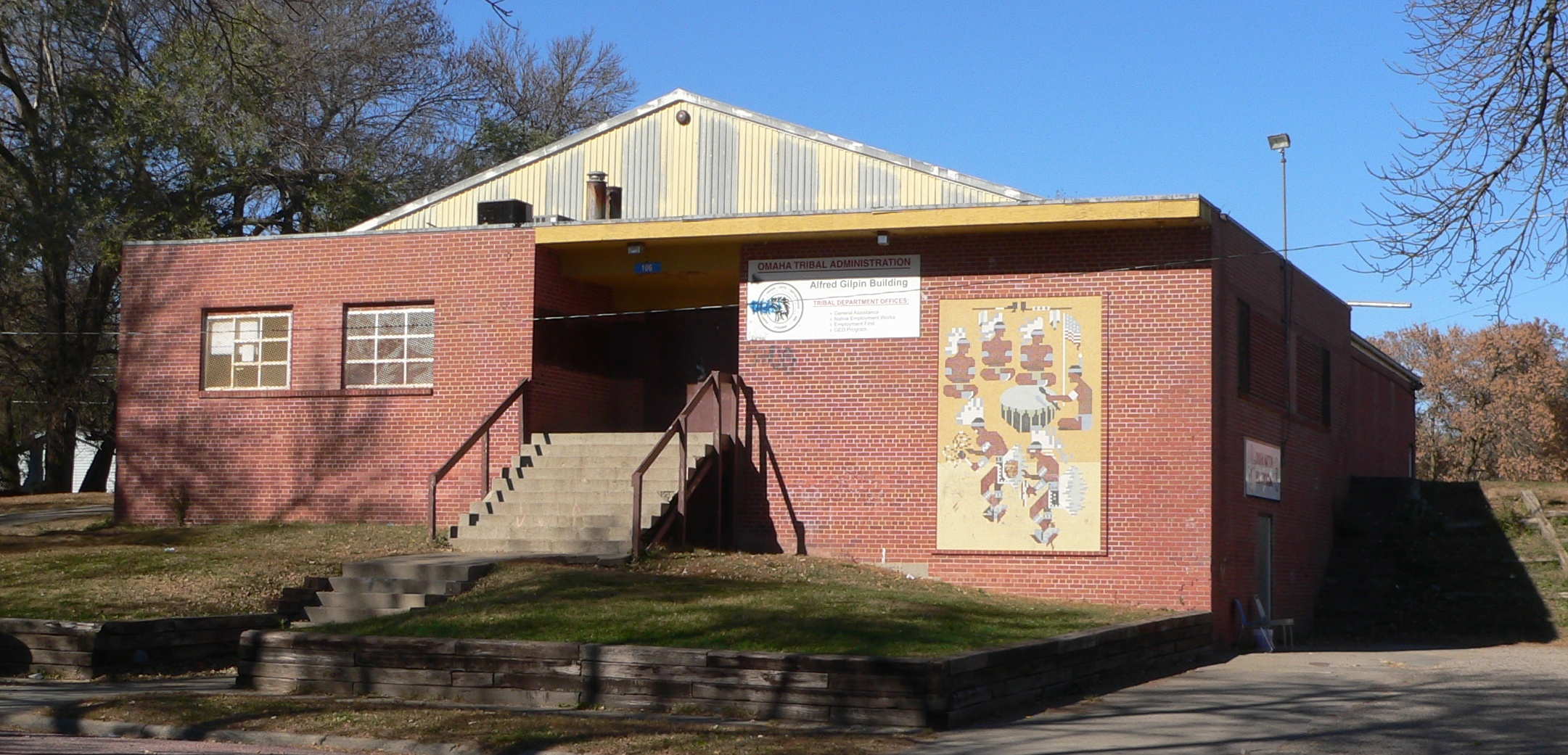
- Alfred Gilpin Tribal Administration Building

- Location of Macy, Nebraska
- Coordinates: 42°06′57″N 96°22′00″W
- Country: United States
- State: Nebraska
- County: Thurston

Area
  - Total: 1.59 sq mi (4.13 km^{2})
  - Land: 1.59 sq mi (4.13 km^{2})
  - Water: 0 sq mi (0.00 km^{2})
- Elevation: 1,188 ft (362 m)

Population (2020)
  - Total: 1,045
  - Density: 655.0/sq mi (252.91/km^{2})
- Time zone: UTC-6 (Central (CST))
  - Summer (DST): UTC-5 (CDT)
- ZIP code: 68039
- Area code: 402
- FIPS code: 31-30170
- GNIS feature ID: 2393115

Macy is a census-designated place (CDP) in Thurston County, Nebraska, United States. The population was 1,045 at the 2020 census. It is within the Omaha Reservation, and includes Omaha Nation Public Schools.

== History ==
The first post office at Macy was established in 1906. Macy was named from a compound of the words Omaha and Agency.

== Geography ==
According to the United States Census Bureau, the CDP has a total area of 1.6 square miles (4.1 km^{2}), all land.

== Demographics ==
Historical population
Census	Pop.	Note	%±
2020	1,045		—
U.S. Decennial Census

=== 2020 census ===
As of the census of 2020, the population was 1,045. The population density was 655.2 inhabitants per square mile (253.0/km^{2}). There were 229 housing units at an average density of 143.6 per square mile (55.4/km^{2}). The racial makeup of the cdp was 98.1% Native American, 0.7% White, 0.1% Asian, 0.5% from other races, and 0.7% from two or more races. Ethnically, the population was 0.9% Hispanic or Latino of any race.

=== 2000 census ===
As of the census of 2000, there were 956 people, 210 households, and 182 families residing in the CDP. The population density was 594.7 inhabitants per square mile (229.6/km^{2}). There were 218 housing units at an average density of 135.6 per square mile (52.4/km^{2}). The racial makeup of the CDP was 2.30% White, 96.44% Native American, 0.10% Asian, 0.21% from other races, and 0.94% from two or more races. Hispanic or Latino of any race were 1.78% of the population.

There were 210 households, out of which 54.3% had children under the age of 18 living with them, 30.0% were married couples living together, 49.0% had a female householder with no husband present, and 12.9% were non-families. 11.4% of all households were made up of individuals, and 3.3% had someone living alone who was 65 years of age or older. The average household size was 4.45 and the average family size was 4.79.

In the CDP, the population was spread out, with 49.4% under the age of 18, 10.3% from 18 to 24, 22.6% from 25 to 44, 11.0% from 45 to 64, and 6.8% who were 65 years of age or older. The median age was 18 years. For every 100 females, there were 87.8 males. For every 100 females age 18 and over, there were 82.0 males.

The median income for a household in the CDP was $19,500, and the median income for a family was $19,417. Males had a median income of $19,688 versus $20,625 for females. The per capita income for the CDP was $5,640. About 46.2% of families and 49.1% of the population were below the poverty line, including 51.1% of those under age 18 and 50.0% of those age 65 or over.

== Education ==
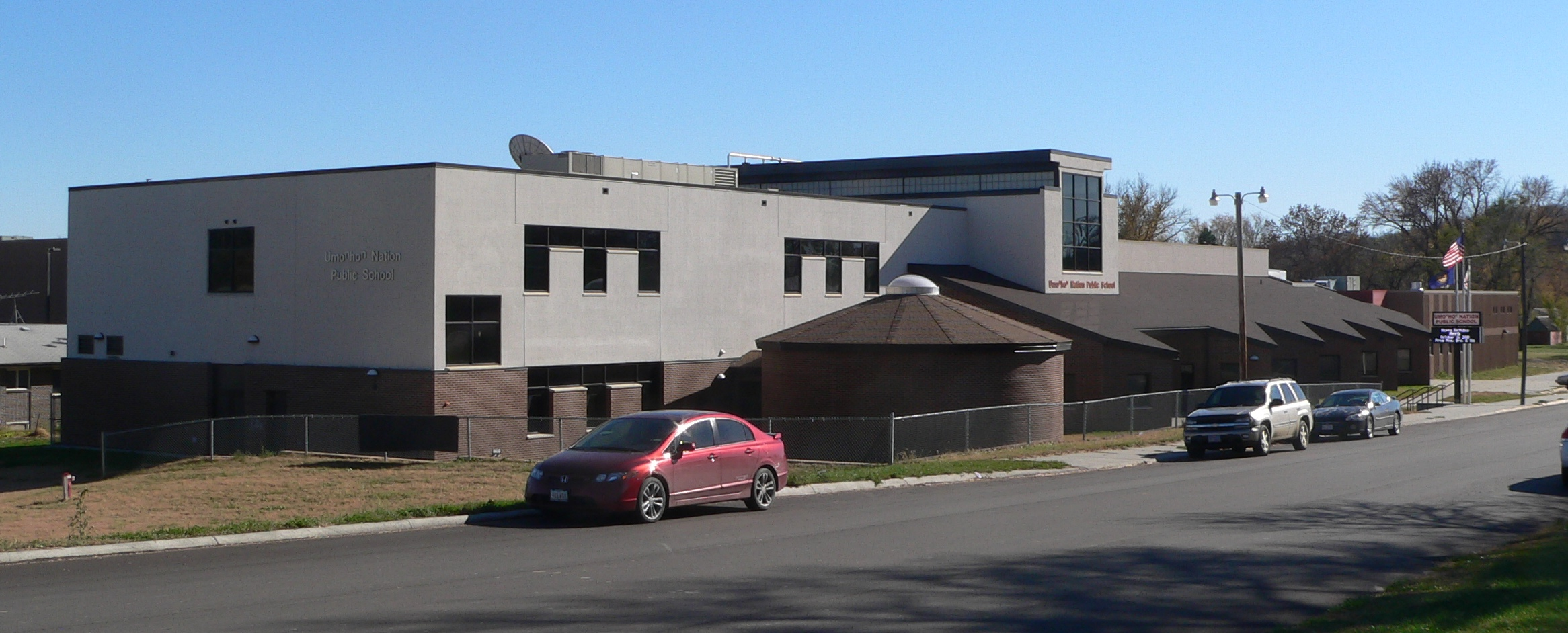
Umoⁿhoⁿ Nation Public Schools facility (Omaha Nation Public School) in Macy, October 2010

The school district is Umoⁿhoⁿ Nation Public Schools (Omaha Nation Public Schools).

== Notable people ==
- Rodney A. Grant, actor born in Macy
- Tuffy Griffiths, boxer
- Susan La Flesche Picotte, first Native American woman physician

== See also ==
- List of census-designated places in Nebraska
