= Anderson Township, New Madrid County, Missouri =

Township in the US state of Missouri

Coordinates: 36°26′40″N 89°54′22″W

Anderson Township is a township in New Madrid County, in the U.S. state of Missouri. Its population was 1,436 as of the 2010 census.
