= Ponca Historic District =

Historic district in Nebraska, United States

- U.S. National Register of Historic Places
- U.S. Historic district
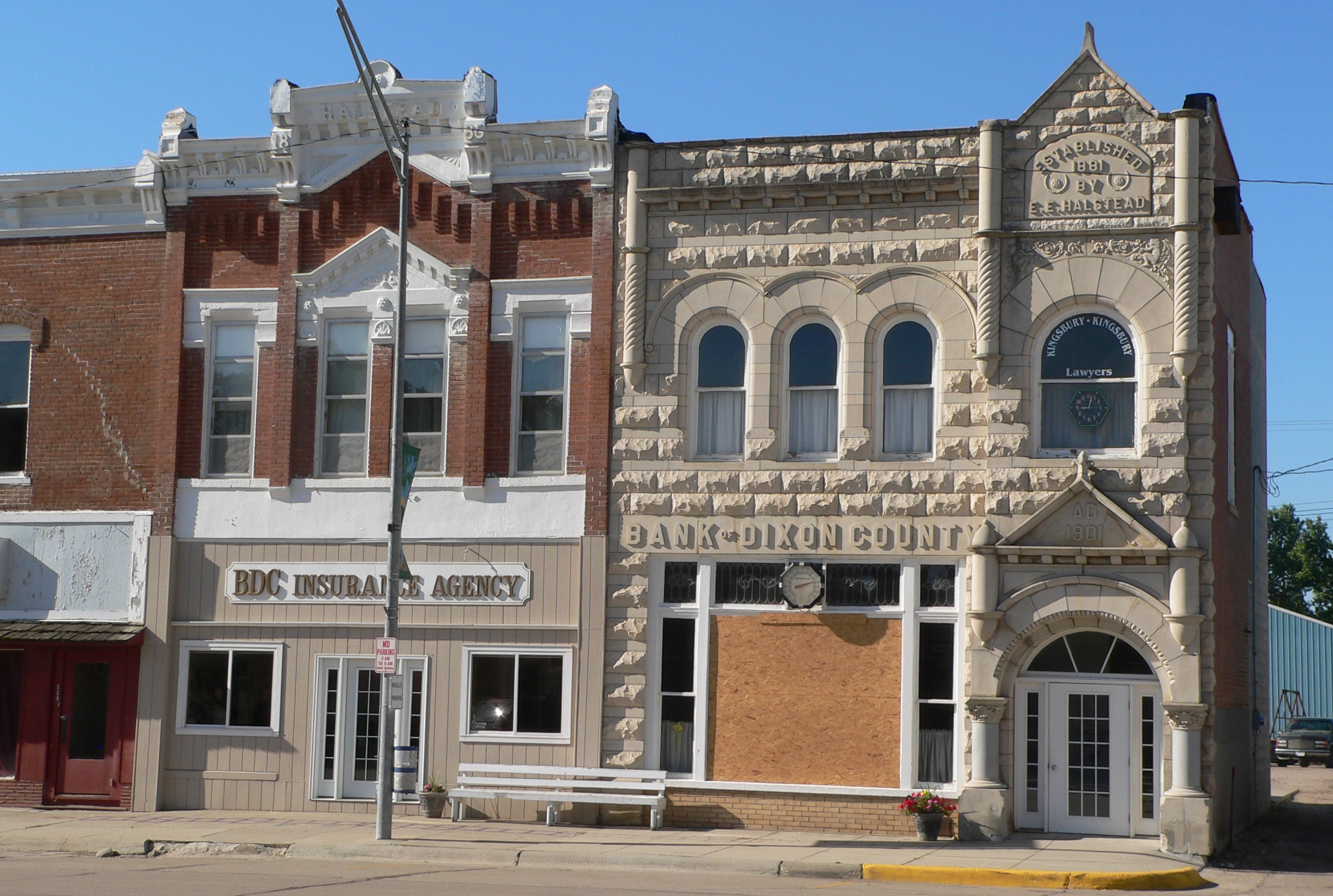
- Bank of Dixon County building

- Location within Nebraska Location within the United States
- Location: Roughly bounded by East, Court, 2nd and 3rd Sts., Ponca, Nebraska
- Area: 40 acres (16 ha)
- NRHP reference No.: 79001438
- Added to NRHP: May 18, 1979

The Ponca Historic District is a historic district in Ponca, Nebraska that was listed on the National Register of Historic Places in 1979. It includes the commercial center of Ponca, including 38 contributing buildings.

These include:

- Ponca City Hall at 123 West 3rd Street.
- Salem Lutheran Church, an Akron Plan church (accompanying photos 16, 17, 28, 37 & 38)
- Carnegie Library (accompanying photos 13, 14, 15)
- First Presbyterian Church, a vernacular brick church
- First Methodist Church, also a vernacular brick church
- Security Bank (photos 1 & 2)
- Bank of Dixon County (photos 3 & 35)

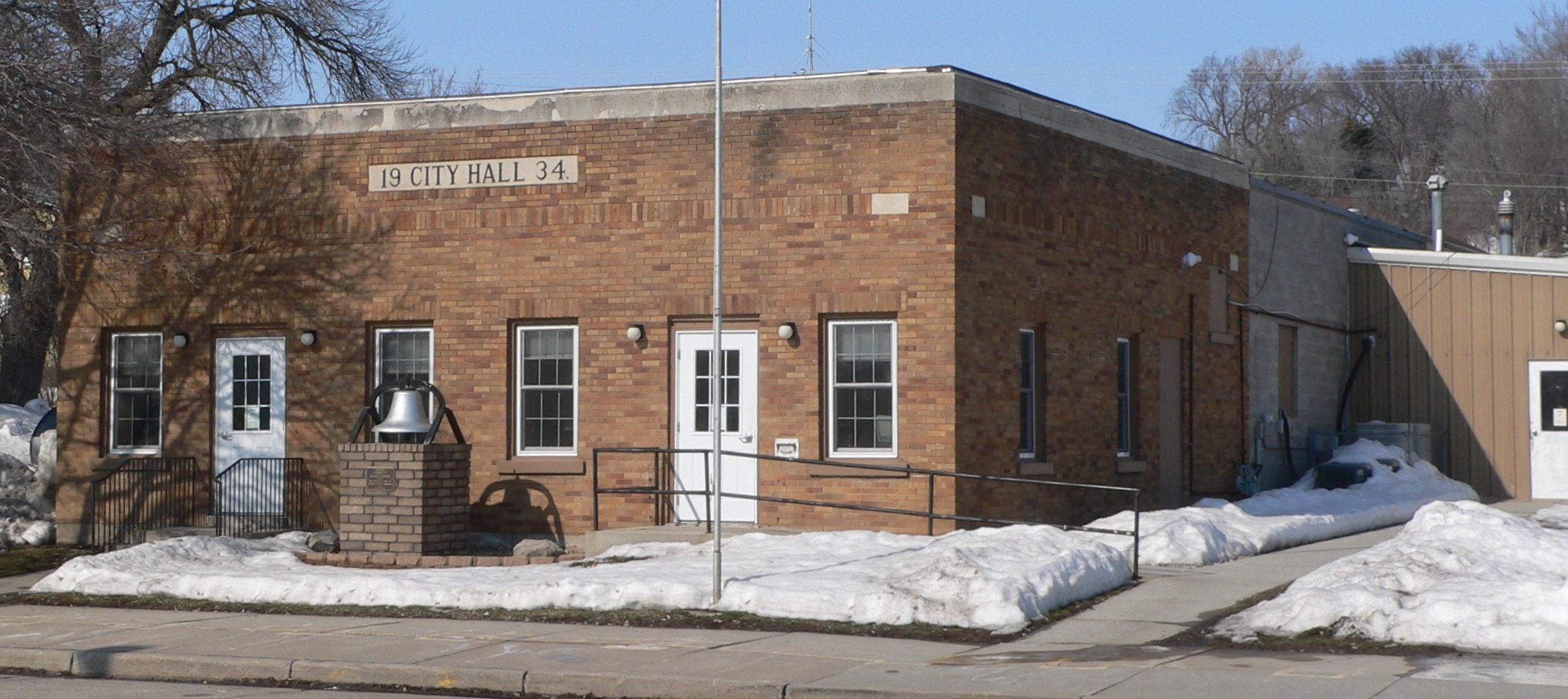
Ponca City Hall
