= Cleveland Township, Knox County, Nebraska =

Cleveland Township
- Township
- Location in Knox County
- Coordinates: 42°28′27″N 097°47′19″W
- Country: United States
- State: Nebraska
- County: Knox

Area
  - Total: 35.99 sq mi (93.21 km^{2})
  - Land: 35.97 sq mi (93.15 km^{2})
  - Water: 0.023 sq mi (0.06 km^{2}) 0.06%
- Elevation: 1,814 ft (553 m)

Population (2020)
  - Total: 115
  - Density: 3.20/sq mi (1.23/km^{2})
- GNIS feature ID: 0837928

Cleveland Township is one of thirty townships in Knox County, Nebraska, United States. The population was 115 at the 2020 census. A 2023 estimate placed the township's population at 115.

== See also ==
- County government in Nebraska
