= Anderson Township, Phelps County, Nebraska =

Anderson Township
- Township
- Location in Phelps County
- Coordinates: 40°34′17″N 099°14′08″W
- Country: United States
- State: Nebraska
- County: Phelps

Area
  - Total: 39.45 sq mi (102.18 km^{2})
  - Land: 39.43 sq mi (102.12 km^{2})
  - Water: 0.023 sq mi (0.06 km^{2}) 0.06%
- Elevation: 2,241 ft (683 m)

Population (2000)
  - Total: 169
  - Density: 4.4/sq mi (1.7/km^{2})
- GNIS feature ID: 0837851

Anderson Township is one of fourteen townships in Phelps County, Nebraska, United States. The population was 169 at the 2000 census. A 2006 estimate placed the township's population at 172.
