= Bancroft Township, Cuming County, Nebraska =

Bancroft Township
- Township
- Location in Cuming County
- Coordinates: 42°02′38″N 096°36′53″W
- Country: United States
- State: Nebraska
- County: Cuming

Area
  - Total: 35.81 sq mi (92.75 km^{2})
  - Land: 35.80 sq mi (92.72 km^{2})
  - Water: 0.015 sq mi (0.04 km^{2}) 0.04%
- Elevation: 1,302 ft (397 m)

Population (2020)
  - Total: 656
  - Density: 18.3/sq mi (7.08/km^{2})
- GNIS feature ID: 0837865

Bancroft Township is one of sixteen townships in Cuming County, Nebraska, United States. The population was 656 at the 2020 census. A 2021 estimate placed the township's population at 653.

The Village of Bancroft lies within the Township.

== See also ==
- County government in Nebraska
