= Thurston County, Nebraska =

County in Nebraska, United States

- County
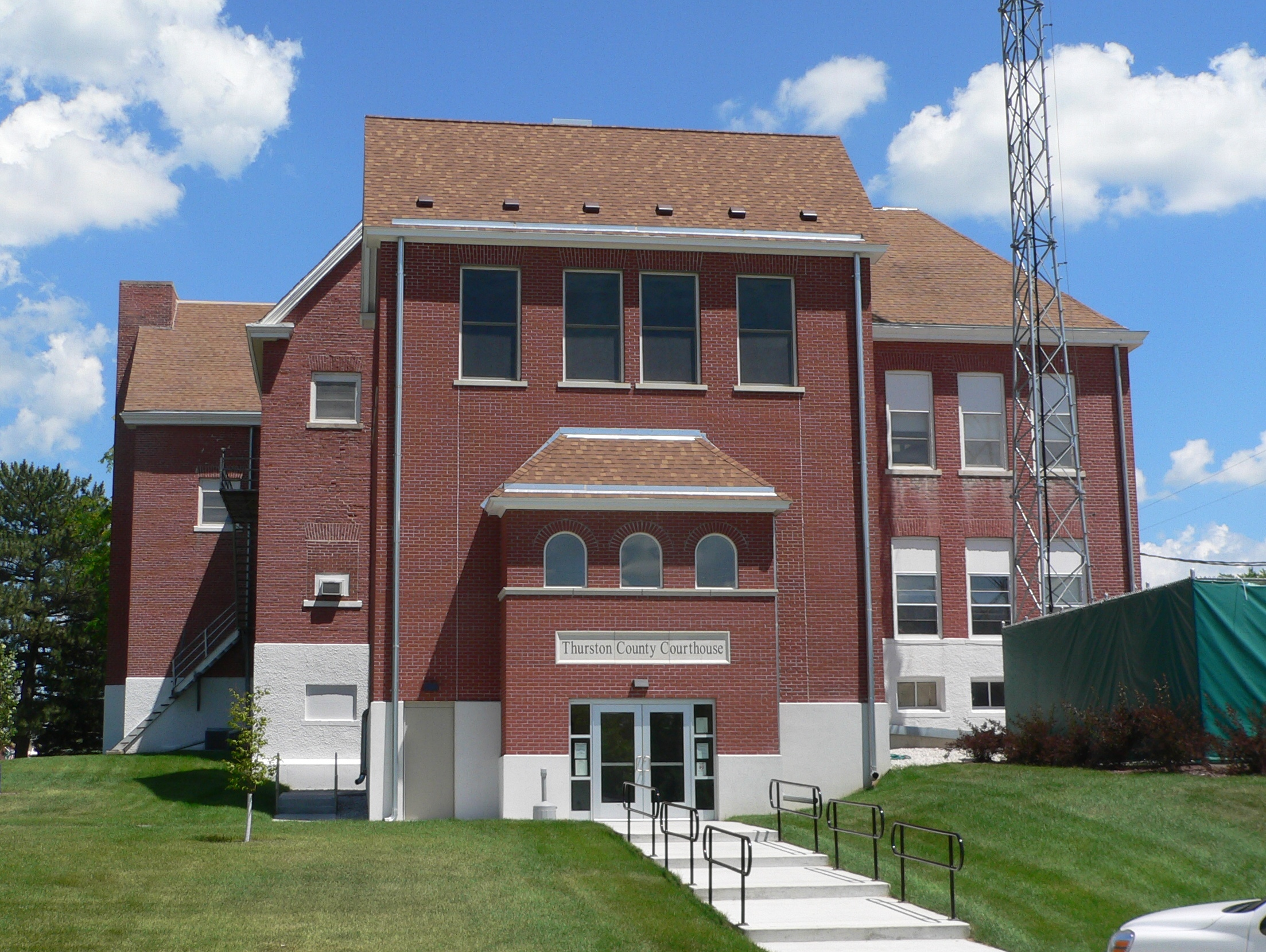
- Thurston County Courthouse in Pender

- Location within the U.S. state of Nebraska
- Coordinates: 42°10′N 96°33′W
- Country: United States
- State: Nebraska
- Founded: 1889
- Named for: John Mellen Thurston
- Seat: Pender
- Largest village: Pender

Area
  - Total: 396 sq mi (1,030 km^{2})
  - Land: 394 sq mi (1,020 km^{2})
  - Water: 2.5 sq mi (6.5 km^{2}) 0.6%

Population (2020)
  - Total: 6,773
  - Estimate (2025): 6,752 ▼
  - Density: 17.2/sq mi (6.64/km^{2})
- Time zone: UTC−6 (Central)
  - Summer (DST): UTC−5 (CDT)
- Congressional district: 1st
- Website: thurstoncountyne.gov

Thurston County is a county in the U.S. state of Nebraska. As of the 2020 United States census, the population was 6,773. Its county seat is Pender.

In the Nebraska license plate system, Thurston County is represented by the prefix 55 (it had the 55th-largest number of vehicles registered in the county when the license plate system was established in 1922).

The Siouan-speaking Omaha and Ho-Chunk have reservations in Thurston County. The two reservations combined comprise the county's entire land area.

== History ==
Varying cultures of indigenous peoples lived along the rivers for hundreds of years before European encounter. The Omaha occupied this territory and much of Nebraska and western Iowa before the Europeans arrived. They had migrated west from the Ohio Valley under pressure from the Iroquois Confederacy in the early 17th century.

Thurston County was organized by European Americans in 1889 from land that had been divided between Dakota and Burt counties since the dissolution of Blackbird County in 1879. It was named for US Senator John M. Thurston.

== Geography ==
Thurston County lies on the east side of Nebraska. Its east boundary line abuts the west boundary line of the state of Iowa, across the Missouri River. The west portion of the county is drained by the Logan Creek Drainage, which flows south-southeast. Thurston County has a total area of 396 square miles (1,030 km^{2}), of which 394 square miles (1,020 km^{2}) is land and 2.5 square miles (6.5 km^{2}) (0.6%) is water. The land area of the county is completely comprised from the Omaha and Winnebago Indian reservations.

=== Major highways ===
- U.S. Highway 75
- U.S. Highway 77
- Nebraska Highway 9
- Nebraska Highway 16
- Nebraska Highway 94

=== Adjacent counties ===
- Dakota County - north
- Woodbury County, Iowa - northeast
- Monona County, Iowa - east
- Burt County - southeast
- Cuming County - southwest
- Wayne County - west
- Dixon County - northwest

== Demographics ==
Historical population
Census	Pop.	Note	%±
1870	31		—
1880	109		251.6%
1890	3,176		2,813.8%
1900	6,517		105.2%
1910	8,704		33.6%
1920	9,589		10.2%
1930	10,462		9.1%
1940	10,243		−2.1%
1950	8,590		−16.1%
1960	7,237		−15.8%
1970	6,942		−4.1%
1980	7,186		3.5%
1990	6,936		−3.5%
2000	7,171		3.4%
2010	6,940		−3.2%
2020	6,773		−2.4%
2025 (est.)	6,752	▼	−0.3%
US Decennial Census; 1790-1960 1900-1990; 1990-2000 2010 2020 2022

=== 2020 census ===
As of the 2020 census, the county had a population of 6,773. The median age was 29.7 years. 33.4% of residents were under the age of 18 and 13.8% of residents were 65 years of age or older. For every 100 females there were 96.0 males, and for every 100 females age 18 and over there were 92.7 males age 18 and over.

The racial makeup of the county was 36.5% White, 0.4% Black or African American, 58.8% American Indian and Alaska Native, 0.1% Asian, 0.1% Native Hawaiian and Pacific Islander, 1.2% from some other race, and 2.8% from two or more races. Hispanic or Latino residents of any race comprised 3.8% of the population.

0.0% of residents lived in urban areas, while 100.0% lived in rural areas.

There were 2,068 households in the county, of which 42.0% had children under the age of 18 living with them and 30.9% had a female householder with no spouse or partner present. About 23.9% of all households were made up of individuals and 11.4% had someone living alone who was 65 years of age or older.

There were 2,283 housing units, of which 9.4% were vacant. Among occupied housing units, 62.8% were owner-occupied and 37.2% were renter-occupied. The homeowner vacancy rate was 1.3% and the rental vacancy rate was 6.7%.

=== 2000 census ===
As of the 2000 United States census, there were 7,171 people, 2,255 households, and 1,725 families in the county. The population density was 18 people per square mile (6.9 people/km^{2}). There were 2,467 housing units at an average density of 6 units per square mile (2.3/km^{2}). The racial makeup of the county was 45.77% White, 0.15% Black or African American, 52.03% Native American, 0.06% Asian, 0.77% from other races, and 1.23% from two or more races. Hispanic or Latino of any race were 2.43% of the population. 25.9% were of German ancestry. The villages of Emerson, Rosalie, Pender, and Thurston are predominantly white, while the villages of Macy, Walthill, and Winnebago are predominantly Native American.

There were 2,255 households, out of which 40.00% had children under the age of 18 living with them, 50.60% were married couples living together, 19.10% had a female householder with no husband present, and 23.50% were non-families. 21.30% of all households were made up of individuals, and 10.10% had someone living alone who was 65 years of age or older. The average household size was 3.14 and the average family size was 3.64.

The county population contained 36.80% under the age of 18, 8.30% from 18 to 24, 23.90% from 25 to 44, 17.70% from 45 to 64, and 13.20% who were 65 years of age or older. The median age was 30 years. For every 100 females there were 99.40 males. For every 100 females age 18 and over, there were 95.40 males.

The median income for a household in the county was $28,170, and the median income for a family was $30,893. Males had a median income of $24,792 versus $20,481 for females. The per capita income for the county was $10,951. About 19.30% of families and 25.60% of the population were below the poverty line, including 32.60% of those under age 18 and 14.70% of those age 65 or over.

== Politics ==
United States presidential election results for Thurston County, Nebraska
Year	Republican		Democratic		Third party(ies)	
Year	No.	%	No.	%	No.	%
1900	803	54.51%	656	44.53%	14	0.95%
1904	757	56.41%	539	40.16%	46	3.43%
1908	895	54.01%	734	44.30%	28	1.69%
1912	437	23.78%	834	45.38%	567	30.85%
1916	717	35.69%	1,255	62.47%	37	1.84%
1920	1,667	63.34%	925	35.14%	40	1.52%
1924	1,210	37.36%	1,191	36.77%	838	25.87%
1928	1,538	45.33%	1,837	54.14%	18	0.53%
1932	739	18.22%	3,273	80.70%	44	1.08%
1936	1,195	29.42%	2,676	65.88%	191	4.70%
1940	1,973	49.18%	2,039	50.82%	0	0.00%
1944	1,584	49.25%	1,632	50.75%	0	0.00%
1948	1,149	37.81%	1,890	62.19%	0	0.00%
1952	1,918	62.03%	1,174	37.97%	0	0.00%
1956	1,722	55.05%	1,406	44.95%	0	0.00%
1960	1,757	57.19%	1,315	42.81%	0	0.00%
1964	1,194	41.26%	1,700	58.74%	0	0.00%
1968	1,341	56.99%	802	34.08%	210	8.92%
1972	1,565	65.07%	840	34.93%	0	0.00%
1976	1,290	53.91%	1,021	42.67%	82	3.43%
1980	1,454	61.71%	726	30.81%	176	7.47%
1984	1,410	56.40%	1,077	43.08%	13	0.52%
1988	1,105	47.22%	1,225	52.35%	10	0.43%
1992	898	39.79%	865	38.33%	494	21.89%
1996	835	39.50%	962	45.51%	317	15.00%
2000	1,040	49.95%	924	44.38%	118	5.67%
2004	1,154	48.35%	1,212	50.78%	21	0.88%
2008	972	45.72%	1,120	52.68%	34	1.60%
2012	939	42.39%	1,247	56.30%	29	1.31%
2016	1,043	49.95%	919	44.01%	126	6.03%
2020	1,180	49.60%	1,122	47.16%	77	3.24%
2024	1,125	52.99%	978	46.07%	20	0.94%

In recent decades, Native Americans in the United States have become more active politically, voting in increasing numbers in local, state, and national elections. In 2004, Thurston, a majority-Native American county, was the only one in Nebraska with a majority voting for the Democratic Party presidential candidate, John Kerry.

Voter interest was high, and the 2008 presidential election was preceded by a major voter registration drive. The majority of voters in Thurston County voted for Democratic candidate Barack Obama, making the county one of four such in the state. In the 2012 presidential election, Thurston was the only Nebraska county that voted for Obama in his successful re-election bid. In 2016, the county flipped, voting for Republican Donald Trump. In the 2024 presidential election, Trump expanded on his previous performances, carrying it by about 7%.

The predominantly Native American communities in the east of the county (Winnebago, Walthill and Macy) lean Democratic, but despite them having more population altogether than the Republican predominantly white communities in the west of the county, they have lower voter turnouts.

== Communities ==
=== Villages ===
- Emerson (partial)
- Pender (county seat)
- Rosalie
- Thurston
- Walthill
- Winnebago

=== Census-designated place ===
- Macy

=== Townships ===
- Anderson
- Blackbird
- Bryan
- Dawes
- Flournoy
- Merry
- Omaha
- Pender
- Perry
- Thayer
- Winnebago

== Education ==
School districts include:

- Bancroft-Rosalie Community Schools
- Emerson-Hubbard Public Schools
- Homer Community Schools
- Lyons-Decatur Northeast Schools
- Pender Public Schools
- Umoⁿhoⁿ Nation Public Schools
- Wakefield Public Schools
- Walthill Public Schools
- Winnebago Public Schools

== See also ==
- National Register of Historic Places listings in Thurston County, Nebraska
