= Cleveland Township, Cuming County, Nebraska =

Cleveland Township
- Township
- Location in Cuming County
- Coordinates: 42°03′06″N 096°44′17″W
- Country: United States
- State: Nebraska
- County: Cuming

Area
  - Total: 35.70 sq mi (92.46 km^{2})
  - Land: 35.70 sq mi (92.46 km^{2})
  - Water: 0 sq mi (0 km^{2}) 0%
- Elevation: 1,473 ft (449 m)

Population (2020)
  - Total: 177
  - Density: 4.96/sq mi (1.91/km^{2})
- GNIS feature ID: 0837926

Cleveland Township is one of sixteen townships in Cuming County, Nebraska, United States. The population was 177 at the 2020 census. A 2021 estimate placed the township's population at 175.

== See also ==
- County government in Nebraska
