= Anderson Township, Thurston County, Nebraska =

Anderson Township
- Township
- Location in Thurston County
- Coordinates: 42°04′04″N 096°19′51″W
- Country: United States
- State: Nebraska
- County: Thurston

Area
  - Total: 30.90 sq mi (80.04 km^{2})
  - Land: 30.6 sq mi (79.3 km^{2})
  - Water: 0.29 sq mi (0.75 km^{2}) 0.94%
- Elevation: 1,270 ft (387 m)

Population (2020)
  - Total: 126
  - Density: 4.12/sq mi (1.59/km^{2})
- GNIS feature ID: 0837852

Anderson Township is one of eleven townships in Thurston County, Nebraska, United States. The population was 126 at the 2020 census.

== See also ==
- County government in Nebraska
