= Pender, Nebraska =

Village in and county seat of Thurston County, Nebraska, United States

- Village
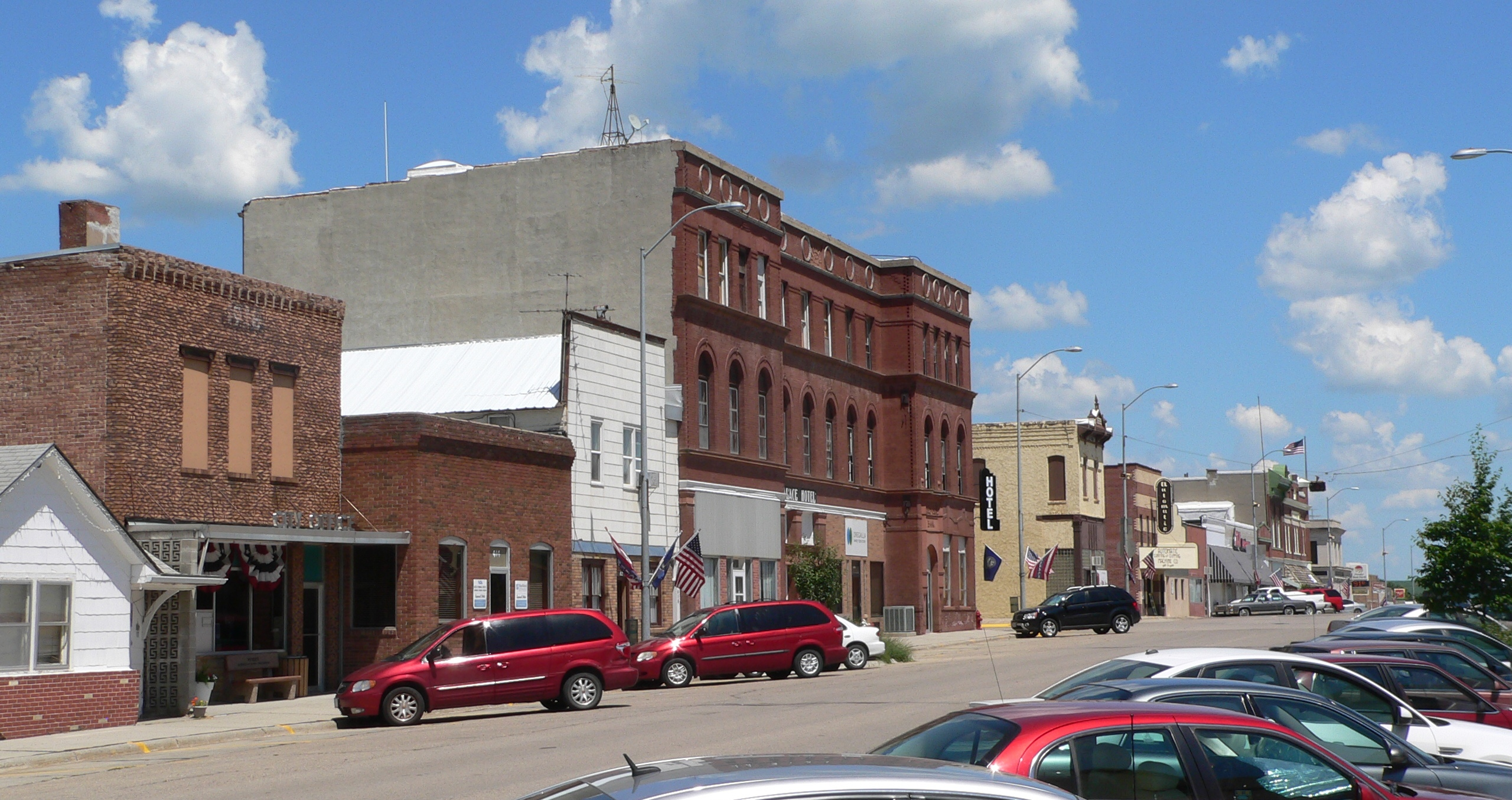
- Downtown Pender: north side of Main Street, July 2010

- Location of Pender, Nebraska

- Location within Nebraska Location within the United States
- Coordinates: 42°06′38″N 96°42′41″W
- Country: United States
- State: Nebraska
- County: Thurston
- Township: Pender

Area
  - Total: 0.71 sq mi (1.83 km^{2})
  - Land: 0.71 sq mi (1.83 km^{2})
  - Water: 0 sq mi (0.00 km^{2})
- Elevation: 1,322 ft (403 m)

Population (2020)
  - Total: 1,115
  - Density: 1,578.9/sq mi (609.61/km^{2})
- Time zone: UTC-6 (Central (CST))
  - Summer (DST): UTC-5 (CDT)
- ZIP code: 68047
- Area code: 402
- FIPS code: 31-38750
- GNIS feature ID: 2399647
- Website: www.villageofpender.com

Pender is a village in and the county seat of Thurston County, Nebraska, United States. On March 22, 2016, the United States Supreme Court resolved a disagreement as to whether Pender is located on the Omaha Indian Reservation, holding unanimously that "the disputed land is within the reservation’s boundaries." The predominantly European-American population was 1,115 at the 2020 census.

== History ==
European-American settlers founded the village in April 1885, naming it in honor of the Scottish politician and businessman Sir John Pender, a pioneer of the Transatlantic Cable. He founded what is now Cable & Wireless Worldwide, and was a director of the Chicago, St. Paul, Minneapolis & Omaha Railway.

== Current issues ==
Tribal authorities of the federally recognized Omaha Nation assert that Pender is within the boundaries of the reservation as defined in its 1865 treaty with the United States. However, a Nebraska state court held in 1999 that the western boundary was a railroad right-of-way east of Pender, because of Omaha land sales to white farmers over the decades. The tribe's response is that the state does not have the power to redefine the boundary set by the Omaha treaty with the US government in 1865.

The boundary and jurisdiction issues have received recent testing related to traffic control and liquor sales. Seeking to gain revenue from "nuisance" businesses, the Omaha in 2006 passed a law establishing the requirement for liquor merchants to pay the tribe license fees and a 10% sales tax to operate within the reservation. It notified the seven liquor stores in Pender, as well as those in Rosalie, and Walthill, Nebraska, all within reservation boundaries, that as of January 1, 2007, they would have to pay the Omaha Tribe licensing fees and a 10 percent tax on sales in order to continue to operate within the reservation. Ben Thompson, an Omaha attorney who represents the tribe, said that it had the legal right to establish such laws within the reservation. The executive director of the Nebraska State Liquor Commission said that he would consult with the state attorney general on the issue.

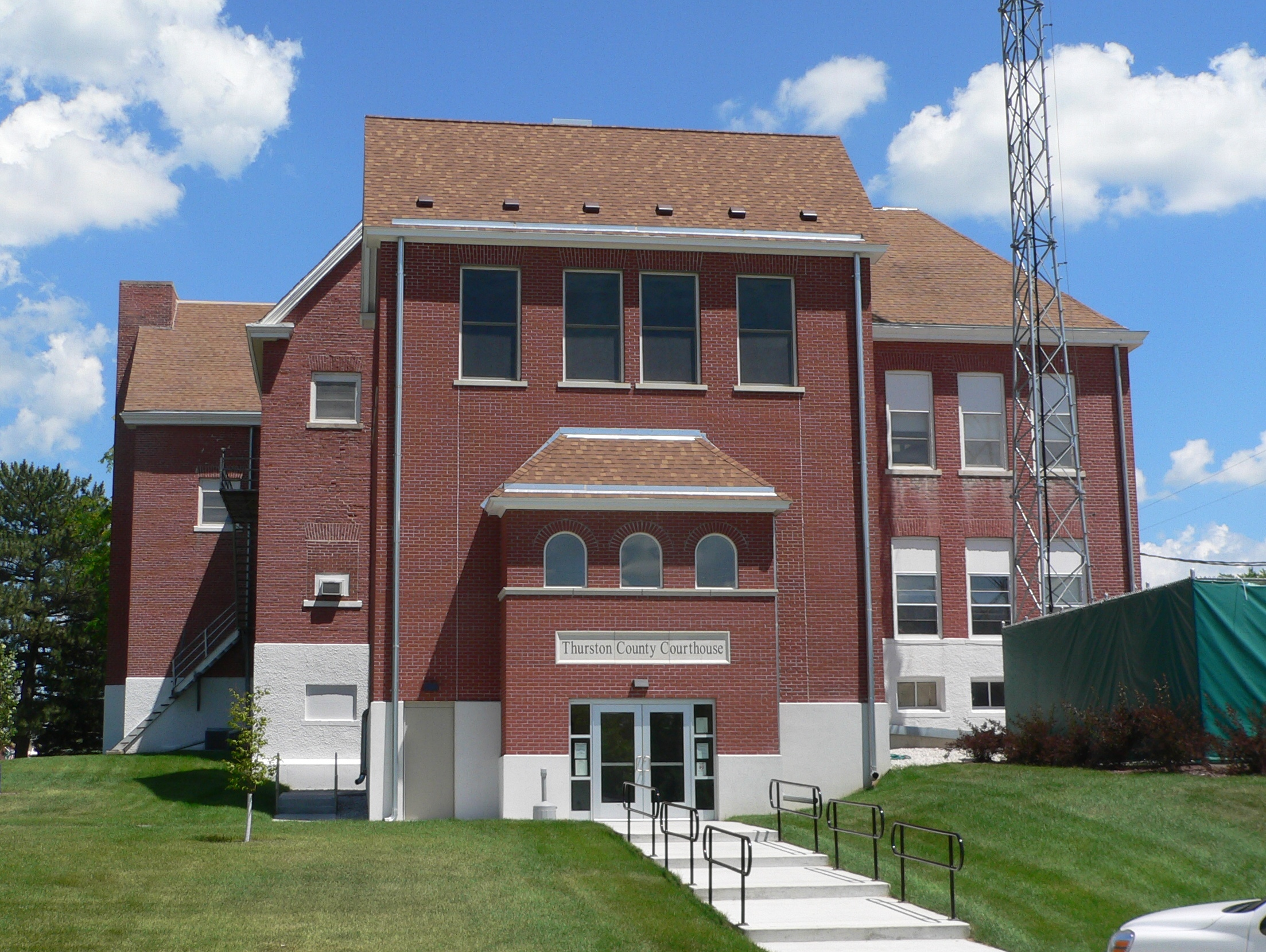
Thurston County Courthouse in Pender, July 2010

In April 2007, liquor merchants in Pender (later joined by the village) filed a federal lawsuit challenging the tribe's authority to demand the liquor taxes, based on their contention that Pender was outside the reservation boundaries. In October 2007 the US District Court ordered the parties first to take their challenge to the Omaha Tribal Courts, as part of the "tribal exhaustion doctrine" established by federal precedent, and denied the plaintiffs' request for dismissal. Judge Richard Kopf said he may not be bound by the tribal court, but wanted to hear their opinion. He required the parties to report back to him regularly until a ruling was made by the Omaha Tribal Courts. While the case was pending, the judge ordered a temporary stay on the merchants' paying the liquor sales tax to the Omaha Tribe.

In January 2012, the plaintiffs in Pender v. Omaha Tribe filed a request with the Omaha Tribal Courts for a summary judgment due to the length of time the case had taken. The defendants requested that no hearing be held before June 2012. The plaintiffs had submitted a detailed report to them by an expert witness on transactions related to Pender and the western boundary. In 2008 the village had voted for a five-year, 1% sales tax to finance its lawsuit related to the boundary and liquor tax issues, as well as to promote economic development in the town.

On March 22, 2016, the Supreme Court of the United States unanimously held in Nebraska v. Parker that Pender was within the boundaries of the Omaha Indian reservation.

== Geography ==
According to the United States Census Bureau, the village has a total area of 0.71 square miles (1.84 km^{2}), all land.

== Demographics ==
Historical population
Census	Pop.	Note	%±
1890	429		—
1900	943		119.8%
1910	804		−14.7%
1920	992		23.4%
1930	1,006		1.4%
1940	1,135		12.8%
1950	1,167		2.8%
1960	1,165		−0.2%
1970	1,229		5.5%
1980	1,318		7.2%
1990	1,208		−8.3%
2000	1,148		−5.0%
2010	1,002		−12.7%
2020	1,115		11.3%
U.S. Decennial Census

=== 2020 census ===
As of the census of 2020, the population was 1,115. The population density was 1,579.3 inhabitants per square mile (609.8/km^{2}). There were 499 housing units at an average density of 706.8 per square mile (272.9/km^{2}). The racial makeup of the village was 92.9% White, 2.4% Native American, 0.3% Black or African American, 0.3% Asian, 2.0% from other races, and 2.2% from two or more races. Ethnically, the population was 3.8% Hispanic or Latino of any race.

=== 2010 census ===
As of the census of 2010, there were 1,002 people, 444 households, and 291 families residing in the village. The population density was 1,411.3 inhabitants per square mile (544.9/km^{2}). There were 497 housing units at an average density of 700.0 per square mile (270.3/km^{2}). The racial makeup of the village was 95.5% White, 1.8% Native American, 0.2% Asian, 0.7% from other races, and 1.8% from two or more races. Hispanic or Latino of any race were 1.7% of the population.

There were 444 households, of which 23.6% had children under the age of 18 living with them, 57.0% were married couples living together, 5.6% had a female householder with no husband present, 2.9% had a male householder with no wife present, and 34.5% were non-families. 31.8% of all households were made up of individuals, and 19.2% had someone living alone who was 65 years of age or older. The average household size was 2.18 and the average family size was 2.75.

The median age in the village was 49.5 years. 19.3% of residents were under the age of 18; 6.3% were between the ages of 18 and 24; 18.3% were from 25 to 44; 28.8% were from 45 to 64; and 27.4% were 65 years of age or older. The gender makeup of the village was 47.9% male and 52.1% female.

=== 2000 census ===
As of the census of 2000, there were 1,148 people, 489 households, and 310 families residing in the village. The population density was 1,801.9 inhabitants per square mile (695.7/km^{2}). There were 542 housing units at an average density of 850.7 per square mile (328.5/km^{2}). The racial makeup of the village was 98.34% White, 0.09% African American, 0.78% Native American, 0.26% from other races, and 0.52% from two or more races. Hispanic or Latino of any race were 0.78% of the population.

There were 489 households, out of which 26.2% had children under the age of 18 living with them, 53.8% were married couples living together, 6.3% had a female householder with no husband present, and 36.6% were non-families. 35.2% of all households were made up of individuals, and 20.7% had someone living alone who was 65 years of age or older. The average household size was 2.22 and the average family size was 2.84.

In the village, the population was spread out, with 21.5% under the age of 18, 7.1% from 18 to 24, 21.3% from 25 to 44, 20.5% from 45 to 64, and 29.6% who were 65 years of age or older. The median age was 45 years. For every 100 females, there were 97.9 males. For every 100 females age 18 and over, there were 92.1 males.

As of 2000 the median income for a household in the village was $30,990, and the median income for a family was $38,333. Males had a median income of $26,008 versus $19,792 for females. The per capita income for the village was $17,672. About 3.9% of families and 6.8% of the population were below the poverty line, including 9.5% of those under age 18 and 7.8% of those age 65 or over.

== Education ==
The local school district is Pender Public Schools.

The Pender High School Pendragons won the Nebraska School Activities Association Class D1 girls basketball state championship in 2013 and 2024, and the Class C2 championship in 2023.

== Notable people ==
- Marion Broadstone – professional American football player
- Monty Budwig – jazz double-bassist known for his work with Vince Guaraldi.
- Dale R. Buis – US soldier killed during Vietnam War; listed as first name on the Vietnam Veterans Memorial in Washington, D.C.
- Bill Busch – American football coach (born 1965)
- Laurie Frink - world-class American jazz trumpeter who worked primarily in big band idioms.
- Loren Miller – African-American civil rights lawyer and judge born in the town; moved as a boy with his family to Kansas.
- Emilio Ochoa - Cuban dentist and political activist; signatory of Cuba's 1940 Constitution; taught Spanish at Pender High School from 1968-70 following exile.
- Maurice Pate – Founding figure of the United Nations Children's Fund; moved to Colorado as a boy.
- Steven M. Reppert - American neuroscientist known for his contributions to the fields of chronobiology and neuroethology.
- Ad Wenke - professional football player.

== See also ==
- List of municipalities in Nebraska
