= Garfield (disambiguation) =

Garfield most commonly refers to:

- Garfield, a comic strip created by Jim Davis
  - Garfield (character), the comic strip's main character
  - "Garfield", an illustrated short story in the 1984 anthology book Garfield: His 9 Lives
  - Garfield: The Movie, a 2004 live-action/CGI film based on the comic
  - The Garfield Movie, a 2024 animated film based on the comic
  - Garfield (video game), a 2004 video game based on the comic
- Garfield (name)
  - James A. Garfield (1831–1881), American politician (20th US President), preacher, lawyer, and Civil War general

Garfield may also refer to:

== Places and transportation ==
=== Australia ===
- Garfield, Queensland, a locality in the Barcaldine Region
- Garfield, Victoria
  - Garfield railway station

=== Canada ===
- Garfield, Alberta
- Garfield Range, Nunavut

=== United States ===
- Garfield, Arkansas
- Freshwater, California, formerly Garfield
- Garfield Avenue (Los Angeles County)
- Garfield, Colorado
- Garfield, Georgia
- Garfield, Bonner County, Idaho
- Garfield, Jefferson County, Idaho
- Garfield, Illinois
- Garfield station (CTA Green Line), a rapid transit station on Garfield Avenue in Chicago
- Garfield station (CTA Red Line), a rapid transit station on Garfield Avenue in Chicago
- Garfield, Indiana
- Garfield, Kansas
- Garfield, Kentucky
- Garfield, Maryland
- Garfield, Grand Traverse County, Michigan, a charter township, casually known as 'Garfield'
- Garfield, Missaukee County, Michigan, a former post office in Richland Township
- Garfield, Saginaw County, Michigan, a settlement in Swan Creek Township
- Garfield, Minnesota
- Garfield, Missouri
- Mount Garfield (New Hampshire)
- Garfield, New Jersey
- Garfield Avenue station, a light rail station in Jersey City, New Jersey
- Garfield, New Mexico
- Garfield, Jackson County, Ohio
- Garfield, Mahoning County, Ohio
- Garfield (Pittsburgh), Pennsylvania
- Garfield, Texas
- Garfield, Virginia, a former post office and locale in Springfield, Virginia
- Garfield, Washington
- Garfield, West Virginia
- Garfield, Jackson County, Wisconsin, a town
- Garfield, Polk County, Wisconsin, a town
- Garfield, Portage County, Wisconsin, an unincorporated community

== Music ==
- Garfield (album), 2002 debut album by American singer-songwriter Adam Green
- "Garfield", a song by American rapper Cupcakke from the 2018 album Eden
- Garfield (band), a 1970s Canadian progressive rock band

== See also ==
- Garfield County (disambiguation)
- Garfield Farm and Inn Museum, a Registered Historic Place in Illinois
- Garfield Heights, Ohio
- Garfield High School (disambiguation)
- Garfield Plantation, Maine
- Garfield Township (disambiguation)
