= Garfield Township, Nebraska =

Garfield Township, Nebraska may refer to the following places:

- Garfield Township, Antelope County, Nebraska
- Garfield Township, Buffalo County, Nebraska
- Garfield Township, Cuming County, Nebraska
- Garfield Township, Custer County, Nebraska
- Garfield Township, Phelps County, Nebraska

== See also ==
- Garfield Township (disambiguation)
