= Garfield Township, Michigan =

Garfield Township is the name of some places in the U.S. state of Michigan:

- Garfield Township, Bay County, Michigan
- Garfield Township, Clare County, Michigan
- Garfield Township, Grand Traverse County, Michigan (Garfield Charter Township, Michigan)
- Garfield Township, Kalkaska County, Michigan
- Garfield Township, Mackinac County, Michigan
- Garfield Township, Newaygo County, Michigan

== See also ==
- Garfield, Michigan (disambiguation)
- Garfield Township (disambiguation)
