= Garfield Township, Minnesota =

Garfield Township, Minnesota may refer to:

- Garfield Township, Lac qui Parle County, Minnesota
- Garfield Township, Polk County, Minnesota

== See also ==
- Garfield Township (disambiguation)
