= Discovery, Maryland =

Discovery, Maryland may refer to the following places in Maryland:

- Discovery, Frederick County, Maryland, an unincorporated community
- Discovery, St. Mary's County, Maryland, an unincorporated community
- Discovery-Spring Garden, Maryland, a former census-designated place in Frederick County
