= Charlesville =

Charlesville can mean:

Canada

- Charlesville, Nova Scotia

United States

- Charlesville, Maryland
- Charlesville, Minnesota
- Charlesville, Pennsylvania

Africa

- a district within Kopanong Local Municipality, South Africa
- Djokupunda, a small town in the Kasai-Occidental province of the Democratic Republic of the Congo, known in colonial times as Charlesville

== See also ==
- Charleville (disambiguation)
