= Garfield Township =

Garfield Township may refer to:

== Illinois ==
- Garfield Township, Grundy County, Illinois

== Iowa ==
- Garfield Township, Calhoun County, Iowa
- Garfield Township, Clay County, Iowa
- Garfield Township, Hancock County, Iowa
- Garfield Township, Ida County, Iowa
- Garfield Township, Kossuth County, Iowa
- Garfield Township, Lyon County, Iowa
- Garfield Township, Mahaska County, Iowa
- Garfield Township, Montgomery County, Iowa, in Montgomery County, Iowa
- Garfield Township, Plymouth County, Iowa
- Garfield Township, Pocahontas County, Iowa
- Garfield Township, Sioux County, Iowa

== Kansas ==
- Garfield Township, Clay County, Kansas
- Garfield Township, Decatur County, Kansas
- Garfield Township, Dickinson County, Kansas
- Garfield Township, Ellsworth County, Kansas
- Garfield Township, Finney County, Kansas
- Garfield Township, Jackson County, Kansas
- Garfield Township, Ottawa County, Kansas, in Ottawa County, Kansas
- Garfield Township, Pawnee County, Kansas, in Pawnee County, Kansas
- Garfield Township, Rush County, Kansas, in Rush County, Kansas
- Garfield Township, Smith County, Kansas, in Smith County, Kansas
- Garfield Township, Wabaunsee County, Kansas, in Wabaunsee County, Kansas

== Michigan ==
- Garfield Township, Bay County, Michigan
- Garfield Township, Clare County, Michigan
- Garfield Township, Grand Traverse County, Michigan
- Garfield Township, Kalkaska County, Michigan
- Garfield Township, Mackinac County, Michigan
- Garfield Township, Newaygo County, Michigan

== Minnesota ==
- Garfield Township, Lac qui Parle County, Minnesota
- Garfield Township, Polk County, Minnesota

== Nebraska ==
- Garfield Township, Antelope County, Nebraska
- Garfield Township, Buffalo County, Nebraska
- Garfield Township, Cuming County, Nebraska
- Garfield Township, Custer County, Nebraska
- Garfield Township, Phelps County, Nebraska

== North Dakota ==
- Garfield Township, Traill County, North Dakota, in Traill County, North Dakota

== South Dakota ==
- Garfield Township, Clark County, South Dakota, in Clark County, South Dakota
- Garfield Township, Clay County, South Dakota, in Clay County, South Dakota
- Garfield Township, Douglas County, South Dakota, in Douglas County, South Dakota
- Garfield Township, Hamlin County, South Dakota, in Hamlin County, South Dakota
- Garfield Township, Roberts County, South Dakota, in Roberts County, South Dakota
- Garfield Township, Spink County, South Dakota, in Spink County, South Dakota
