= Graceham Moravian Church and Parsonage =

Historic church in Maryland, United States

- U.S. National Register of Historic Places
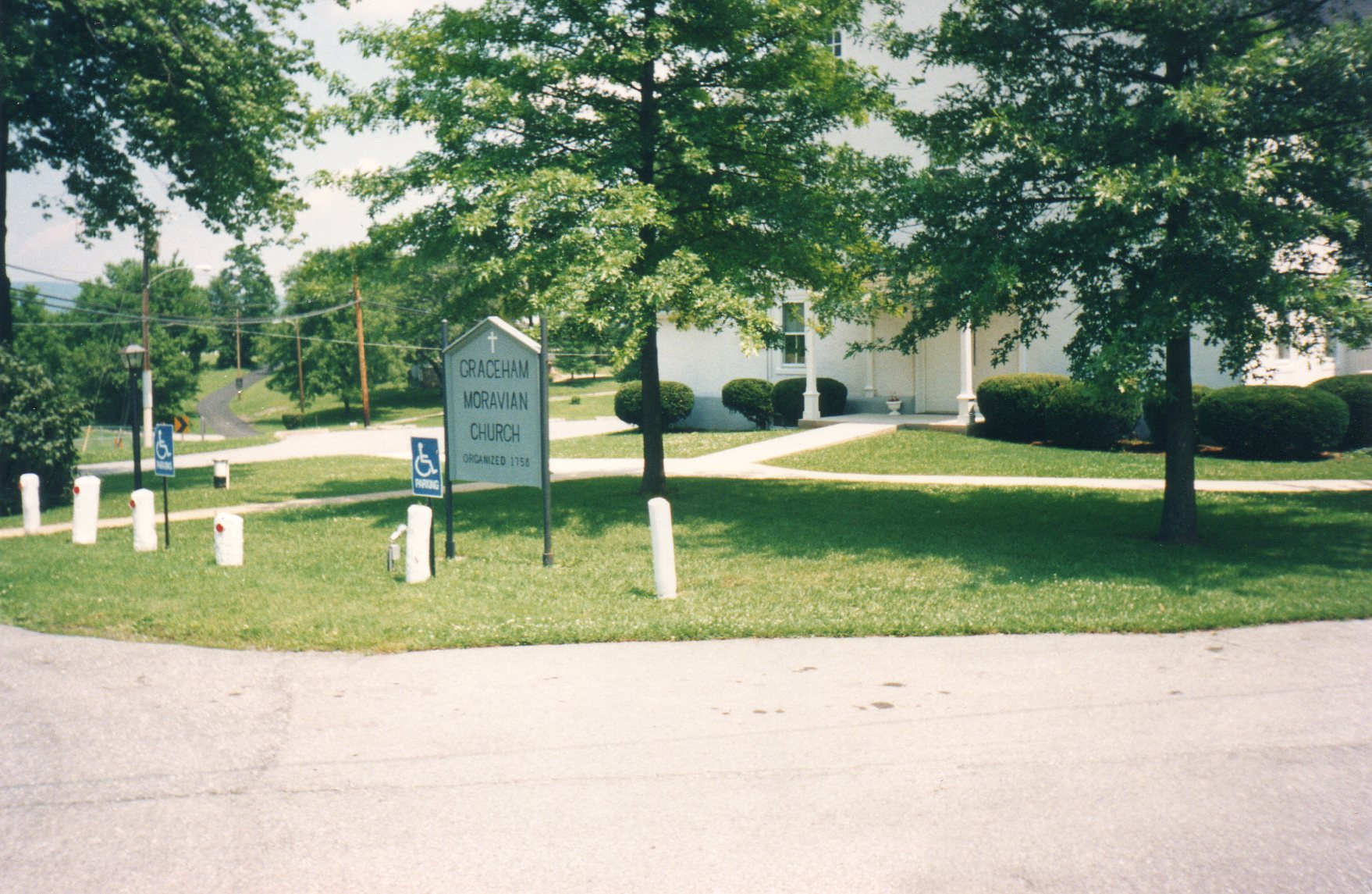
- July 14, 1996

- Location within Maryland Location within the United States
- Nearest city: Thurmont, Maryland
- Coordinates: 39°36′59″N 77°22′43″W
- Area: 15 acres (6.1 ha)
- Built: 1749
- NRHP reference No.: 76000995
- Added to NRHP: May 13, 1976

Graceham Moravian Church and Parsonage is a historic church building and parsonage located at 8231 Rocky Ridge Road, MD 77 in Graceham, east of Thurmont, Frederick County, Maryland. It is a two-story Flemish bond brick church built in 1822, and covered with white stucco because of deteriorated masonry. The church was built as an addition to the adjacent meeting house and parsonage built in 1797. This building and the church's cemetery having uniform flat gravestones (called God's Acre by the Moravians) represents Maryland's only remaining 18th-century Moravian settlement.

== History ==
The Moravian Church originated in Bohemia and Moravia in the 1400s, with the first Moravians settling in North America in the 1700s. The first Moravian settlements were in Pennsylvania, but Moravians began to move south to Maryland, Virginia, and Salem, North Carolina. The Moravians who settled in Maryland were one of the groups to move south during the mid-1700s, travelling from Pennsylvania to Maryland via an Indian road.

The Graceham congregation was formally organized by Bishop Matthaeus Gottfried Hehl on October 8, 1758, as "Manakosy" (Monocacy) Moravian Church. Their first place of worship, a Gemeinhaus (English: "congregation house"), had been constructed in 1749. A second church edifice was dedicated on October 16, 1773, before being replaced by the current edifice that was dedicated on October 27, 1822. The official name change of the village took place in 1785, following the recommendation of Johannes von Watteville, who wrote (transl.), "May this village be a hamlet, or little town of the Lord's, in which grace abides, with simplicity and a childlike spirit," hence the name Graceham.

It was listed on the National Register of Historic Places in 1976.

== Gallery ==
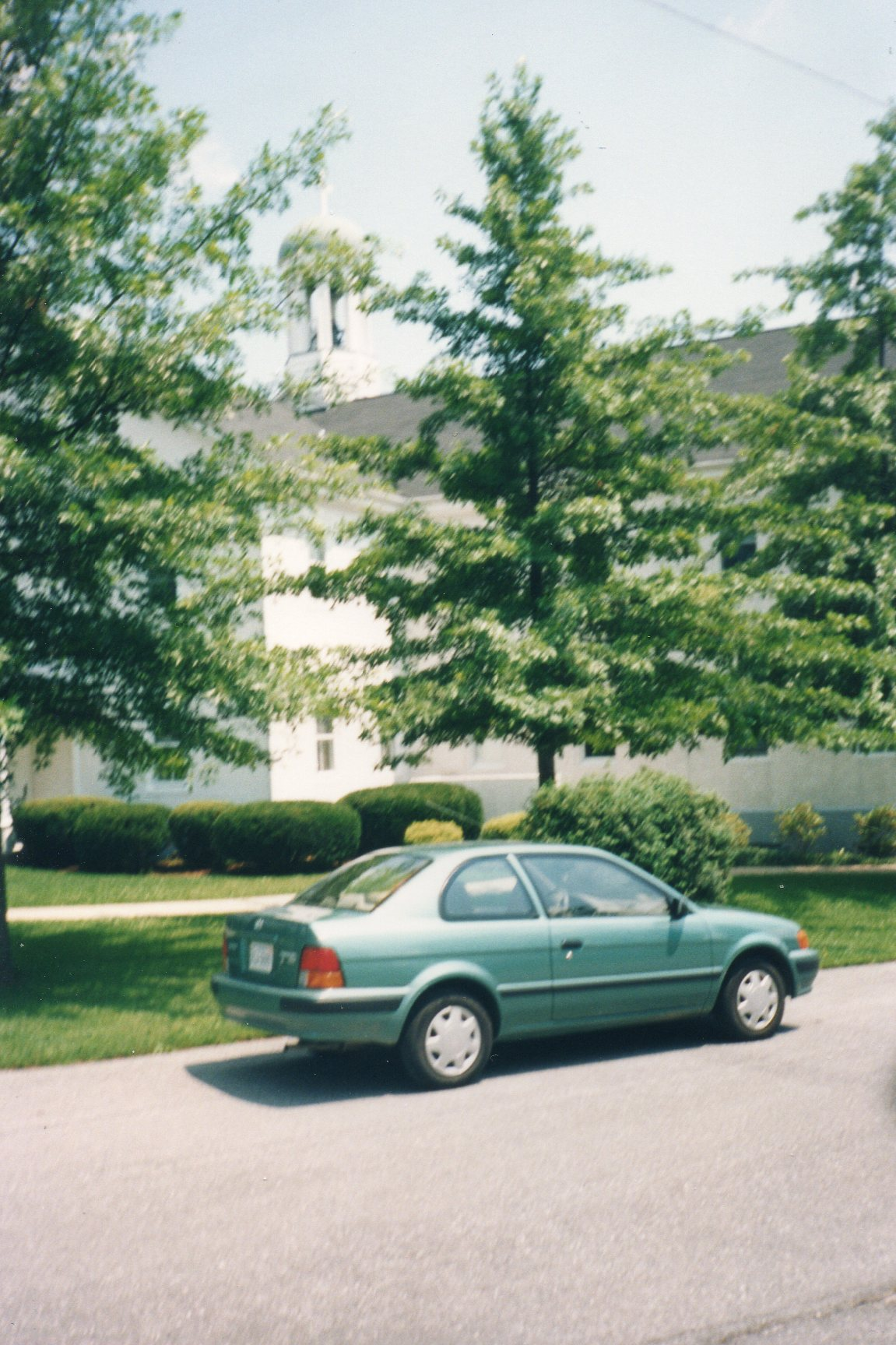
