= Mount Pleasant, Frederick County, Maryland =

Coordinates: 39°27′13″N 77°19′33″W

Mount Pleasant is an unincorporated community in Frederick County, Maryland.
