= Clover Hill, Maryland =

Unincorporated community in Maryland, United States

- Unincorporated community
- Coordinates: 39°27′27″N 77°25′47″W
- Country: United States
- State: Maryland
- County: Frederick

Area
  - Total: 1.2 sq mi (3.2 km^{2})
  - Land: 1.2 sq mi (3.2 km^{2})
  - Water: 0 sq mi (0.0 km^{2})
- Elevation: 364 ft (111 m)

Population (2000)
  - Total: 3,260
  - Density: 2,659/sq mi (1,026.8/km^{2})
- Time zone: UTC−5 (Eastern (EST))
  - Summer (DST): UTC−4 (EDT)
- FIPS code: 24-18100
- GNIS feature ID: 2389334

Clover Hill is an unincorporated community and former census-designated place (CDP) in Frederick County, Maryland, United States. The population was 3,260 at the 2000 census. The area was not listed as a CDP for the 2010 census, and no population total was published.

== Geography ==
Clover Hill is located in central Frederick County and is bordered on all four sides by the city of Frederick, with the downtown section of Frederick to the south.

According to the United States Census Bureau, in 2000 the CDP had a total area of 1.2 square miles (3.1 km^{2}), all land.

In the center of the community is a large park, with two small wetlands that dry in the winter.

== Demographics ==
As of the census of 2000, there were 3,260 people, 1,133 households, and 984 families residing in the CDP. The population density was 2,659.4 inhabitants per square mile (1,026.8/km^{2}). There were 1,143 housing units at an average density of 932.4 per square mile (360.0/km^{2}). The racial makeup of the CDP was 92.82% White, 1.53%African American, 0.15% Native American, 4.05% Asian, 0.37% from other races, and 1.07% from two or more races. Hispanic or Latino of any race were 1.78% of the population.

There were 1,133 households, out of which 40.9% had children under the age of 18 living with them, 80.2% were married couples living together, 4.1% had a female householder with no husband present, and 13.1% were non-families. 10.9% of all households were made up of individuals, and 5.5% had someone living alone who was 65 years of age or older. The average household size was 2.87 and the average family size was 3.10.

In the CDP, the population was spread out, with 27.5% under the age of 18, 4.5% from 18 to 24, 22.1% from 25 to 44, 33.7% from 45 to 64, and 12.3% who were 65 years of age or older. The median age was 43 years. For every 100 females, there were 94.9 males. For every 100 females age 18 and over, there were 96.5 males.

The median income for a household in the CDP was $87,632, and the median income for a family was $90,598. Males had a median income of $68,821 versus $35,147 for females. The per capita income for the CDP was $33,378. None of the families and 0.3% of the population were living below the poverty line, including no under eighteens and none of those over 64.
