= Mars (supermarket) =

U.S. grocery chain

Mars Supermarkets

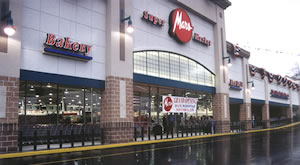
- Mars Supermarket in Ellicott City, Maryland in 2008
- Type: Private
- Founded: 1943; 83 years ago in Dundalk, Maryland, USA
- Founder: Joseph D'Anna
- Defunct: 2016; 10 years ago
- Fate: Bankruptcy; some stores sold to Weis Markets
- Headquarters: Rosedale, Maryland
- Number of locations: 13 (at bankruptcy in 2016)
- Area served: metropolitan Baltimore
- Key people: Carmen V. D'Anna, Jr., President
- Website: marsfood.com

Mars was a local chain of grocery stores in metropolitan Baltimore, Maryland. Mars operated 13 supermarket locations in the Baltimore area until it filed for bankruptcy in 2016.

== History ==
The idea for Mars supermarkets came in the early 1940s from Joseph D'Anna (1919-2008), whose location for his upstart grocery store was an apartment complex in Essex, Maryland, called Mars Estates. Nearby, Glenn L. Martin was developing an airplane called the Mars Flying Boat that could take off and land in water, so "Mars" seemed a perfectly logical name to instill local pride and recognition. His first store opened on Old Eastern Avenue in 1943. It was operated for three years in a partnership with friend Bob Baum. They decided to open a second location in the 300 block of Eastern Ave. As more joined the team, the company decided to re-locate to the south in Dundalk, Maryland, where they purchased a strip center with seven shopfronts to expand their business, closing the Essex locations.

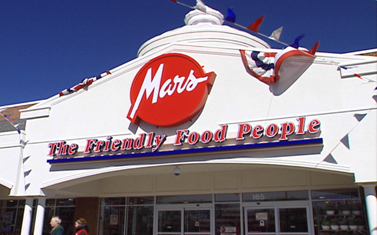
A Mars supermarket in Middle River, MD (2004).

Soon after the move, D'Anna's two younger brothers, Angelo and Carmen, who had returned recently from World War II, decided to help expand the business. Joe sold them his interest in the business, giving 50% to each brother. Mars started at that time, even though the name preexisted the partnership.

As business increased, the store was enlarged several times until it occupied most of the space on the southeast corner of Holabird and Delvale Avenues. A second store was needed, so Angelo and Carmen opened the Grey Manor store on Old North Point Road in 1954, followed four years later by the Middle River store on Eastern Avenue (not far from Joe's original Mars). The company continued to grow due to the very positive response to their marketing approach. With the help of Morris Denkin, the company purchased the Vesper Family property on the opposite side of Holabird Avenue. With the on site direction of Carmen and Angelo, they constructed what many considered the most modern supermarket in the state of Maryland.

Anthony D'Anna, the youngest brother, came to work for Angelo and Carmen in 1949. Initially, he was a grocery and produce clerk, and later managed the store until he moved to a position in the office in 1963. He became vice president and Senior Grocery Buyer.

After the company incorporated, Vincenzo F. D'Anna, their father, was elected to the board of directors as chairman. In 1955, Anthony was made a partner and owner in the business.

After leaving the grocery business, Joe took over the operation of a restaurant from another younger brother, Vince D'Anna. Vince would later join the supermarket business, managing the new store on Eastern Avenue and buying produce for all the stores. Carmen brought Peter, the oldest brother, on board as the company's Produce Buyer and Supervisor.

In 1967, the Middle River store was damaged in a fire and the brothers took this opportunity to completely remodel it, again with the help of Morris Denkin and the added assistance of American Refrigeration. Over the next 26 years, Angelo and Carmen opened 10 more stores. These included Vincenzo's Produce Market and The Light Street Bakery at HarborPlace, which have since closed. The Old North Point Road store also closed, having been replaced by the Mars at Lynch Manor on Wise Avenue.

In January 1995, Angelo N. D'Anna died after serving as the company's president for 50 years. Carmen, who became president at that time, opened three stores in Glen Burnie, Woodlawn, and Edgewood. After fifty years as the company's Executive Vice President and three years as president, Carmen V. D'Anna, Sr. died in August 1997.

Carmen's eldest son, Vito (Carmen V. D'Anna, Jr.), became president at that time. In the nineteen years preceding his appointment to president, Vito worked his way up from bagger to store manager and eventually to Vice President of Operations.

Supported by their own buying staff, Mars purchased produce and seafood daily from local markets and always included local produce, when available, from Maryland growers. Offering many national brands at private label prices, Mars maintains a limited line of their own private label goods.

Mars was serviced by its own 300,000-square-foot (28,000 m^{2}) distribution center in Baltimore, supplying the stores with dry groceries, meats, deli/dairy, frozen and produce until March 2014 when Mars Supermarkets closed the distribution center and began to liquidate its assets including several of its own privately maintained fleet of tractor trailers. As a result, 78 workers lost their jobs. Instead the Company decided to stock stores direct from manufacturers with available transport and receive all other products from one of Bozzuto's Inc's. distribution center outside of Hartford, Connecticut.

In May 2016, Mars announced that all 13 stores would close by July 31, 2016, with five locations being acquired by Weis Markets. The company stated that they have struggled with declining sales for several years. Mars tried to fill the remaining eight locations with other retailers.
