= Garfield (name) =

Garfield is both a surname and a given name. Notable people with the name include:

== People with the surname Garfield ==
- Allen Garfield (1939–2020), American actor
- Andrew Garfield (born 1983), British American actor
- Brian Garfield (1939–2018), American novelist and screenwriter
- Eugene Garfield (1925–2017), American scientist
- Helen Newell Garfield (1866–1930), American socialite and advocate for deaf education.
- Henry Garfield (born 1961), birth name of American artist and musician Henry Rollins
- James A. Garfield (1831–1881), 20th president of the United States
  - His wife, Lucretia Garfield (née Rudolph; 1832–1918)
  - Some of his children:
    - James Rudolph Garfield (1865–1950), lawyer and Secretary of the Interior under President Theodore Roosevelt
    - Harry Augustus Garfield (1863–1942), lawyer, President of Williams College and head of the Federal Fuel Administration
    - Abram Garfield (1872–1958), American architect
- Jason Garfield (born 1974), juggler and founder of the World Juggling Federation
- Joan Garfield, American statistics educator
- John Garfield (1913–1952), American actor
- Leon Garfield (1921–1996), British writer of fiction
- Richard Garfield (born 1963), creator of the game Magic: The Gathering
- Sidney Garfield (1906–1984), American doctor who founded the Kaiser Permanente healthcare system
- Simon Garfield (born 1960), journalist and author

== People with first name Garfield ==
- Garfield Blair (born 1987), Jamaican basketball player
- Garfield W. Brown (1881–1967), American lawyer and politician
- Garfield Darien (born 1987), French sprint hurdler
- Garfield "Gar" Heard (born 1948), former professional basketball player
- Garfield Kennedy, documentary and fiction film-maker
- Garfield Morgan (1931–2009), actor
- Garfield Sobers (1936–2026), cricketer
- Garfield Todd (1908–2002), 5th Prime minister of Rhodesia (1953–1958)
- Garfield Wood (1880–1971), inventor and entrepreneur

== Fictional characters named Garfield ==
- Garfield (character), the title character in the Garfield series.
- Firefly (DC Comics), born Garfield Lynns, a villain in the Detective Comics
- Garfield Logan
- Lawrence Garfield, from Other People's Money
- Garfield Goose, from WGN-TV's Garfield Goose and Friends
