= Frederick County, Maryland =

Frederick County
- County
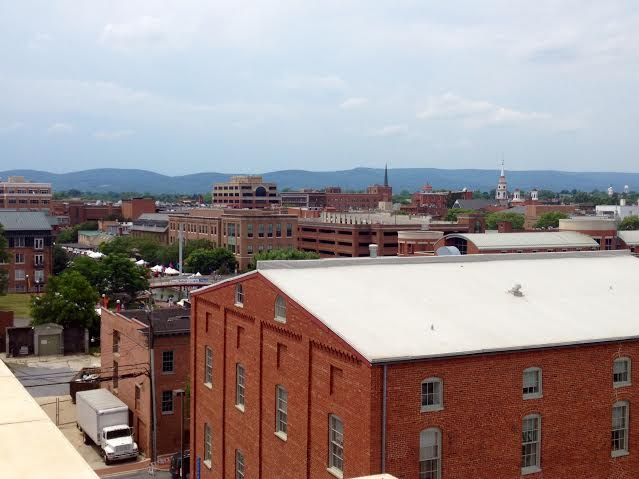
- Downtown Frederick with the Blue Ridge Mountains in the distance in June 2014

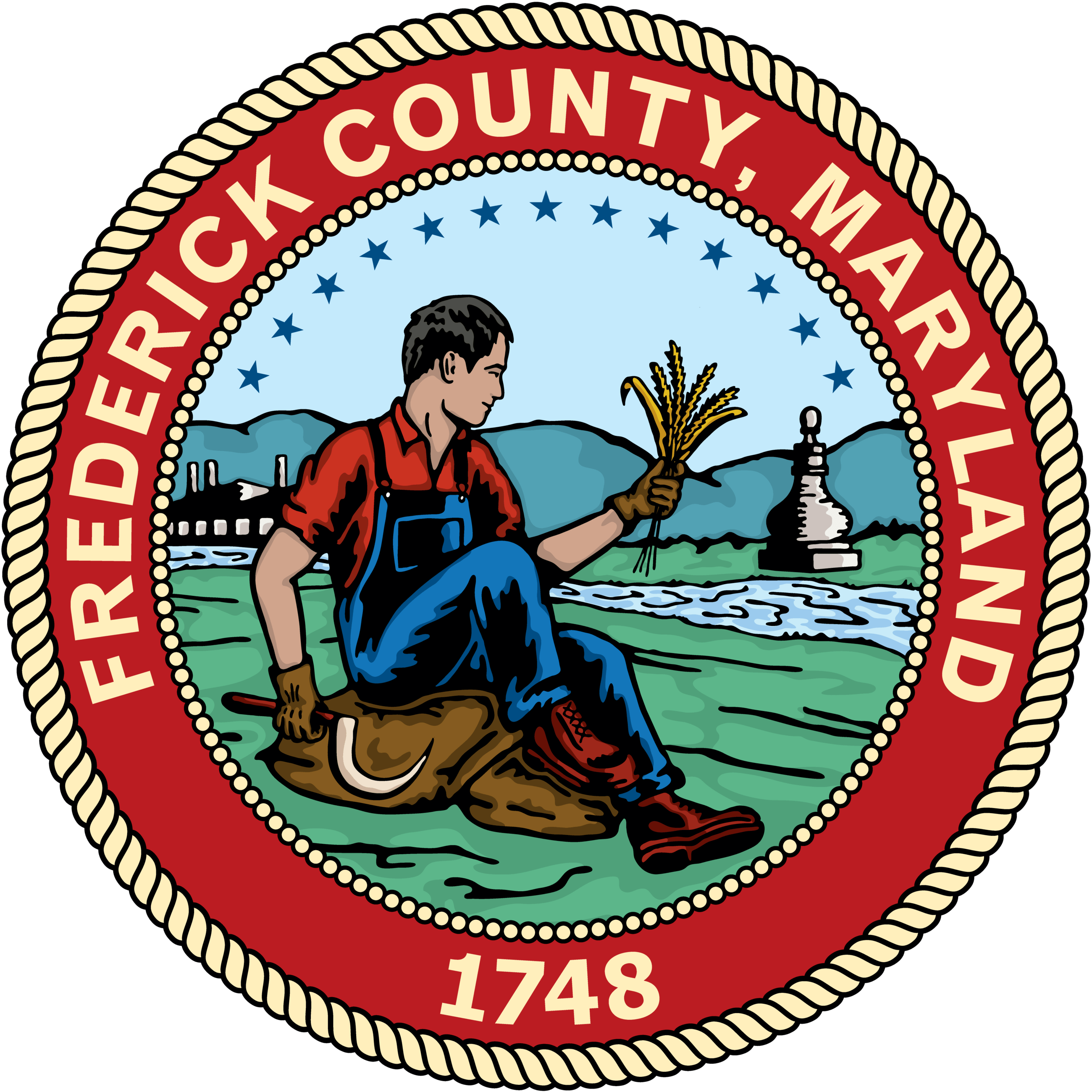
- Flag Seal
- Nicknames: "Frederick", "FredCo"
- Location of Frederick County in Maryland
- Coordinates: 39.47°N 77.40°W
- Country: United States
- State: Maryland
- Founded: June 10, 1748
- Founder: Daniel Dulany the Elder
- Named for: Frederick Calvert, 6th Baron Baltimore
- County seat: Frederick

Government
  - County Executive: Jessica Fitzwater
  - County Council: Renee Knapp (D); Brad Young (D); Jerry Donald (D); Steven McKay (R); M. C. Keegan-Ayer (D); Kavonte Duckett (D); Mason Carter (R)

Area
  - Total: 667 sq mi (1,730 km^{2})
  - Land: 660 sq mi (1,700 km^{2})
  - Water: 7.2 sq mi (19 km^{2}) 1.1%

Population (2020)
  - Total: 271,717
  - Estimate (2025): 302,883 ▲
  - Density: 410/sq mi (160/km^{2})
- Demonym: "Fredneck"
- Time zone: Eastern (EST)
  - Summer (DST): EDT
- ZIP Codes: 21701, 21702, 21703, 21704, 21705, 21709
- Area codes: 301, 240
- Congressional districts: 6th
- Website: http://www.FrederickCountyMD.gov/

Frederick County is located in Maryland, United States. As of the 2020 U.S. census, the population was 271,717. The county seat is Frederick. The county is part of the Capital region of the state.

Like other outlying sections of the Washington metropolitan area, Frederick County has experienced a rapid population increase since the 1980s. It borders the southern border of Pennsylvania and the northeastern border of Virginia.

Catoctin Mountain Park in the county is the location of Camp David, a U.S. presidential retreat, and Fort Detrick, a U.S. Army base.

== Etymology ==
The namesake of Frederick County and its county seat is unknown, but it was probably either Frederick, Prince of Wales, or Frederick Calvert, 6th Baron Baltimore.

== History ==
Frederick County was created in 1748 by the Province of Maryland from parts of Prince George's County and Baltimore County.

In 1776, following US independence, Frederick County was divided into three parts. The westernmost portion became Washington County, named after George Washington, the southernmost portion became Montgomery County, named after another Revolutionary War general, Richard Montgomery. The northern portion remained Frederick County.

In 1837, a part of Frederick County was combined with a part of Baltimore County to form Carroll County which is east of current day Frederick County.

The county has a number of properties on the National Register of Historic Places.

== Geography ==
Washington-Arlington-Alexandria, DC-VA-MD-WV Metropolitan Statistical Area

According to the U.S. Census Bureau, the county has a total area of 667 square miles (1,730 km^{2}), of which 660 square miles (1,700 km^{2}) is land and 7.2 square miles (19 km^{2}) (1.1%) is water. It is the largest county in Maryland in terms of land area.

Frederick County straddles the boundary between the Piedmont Plateau Region and the Appalachian Mountains. The county's two prominent ridges, Catoctin Mountain and South Mountain, form an extension of the Blue Ridge. The Middletown Valley lies between them.

Attractions in the Frederick area include the Clustered Spires, a monument to Francis Scott Key, the National Museum of Civil War Medicine, Monocacy National Battlefield and South Mountain battlefields, and the Schifferstadt Architectural Museum.

=== Adjacent counties ===
- Adams County, Pennsylvania (north)
- Carroll County (east)
- Montgomery County (south)
- Loudoun County, Virginia (southwest)
- Washington County (west)
- Franklin County, Pennsylvania (northwest)

=== National protected areas ===
- Catoctin Mountain Park
- Chesapeake and Ohio Canal National Historical Park (part)
- Monocacy National Battlefield

=== Major highways ===
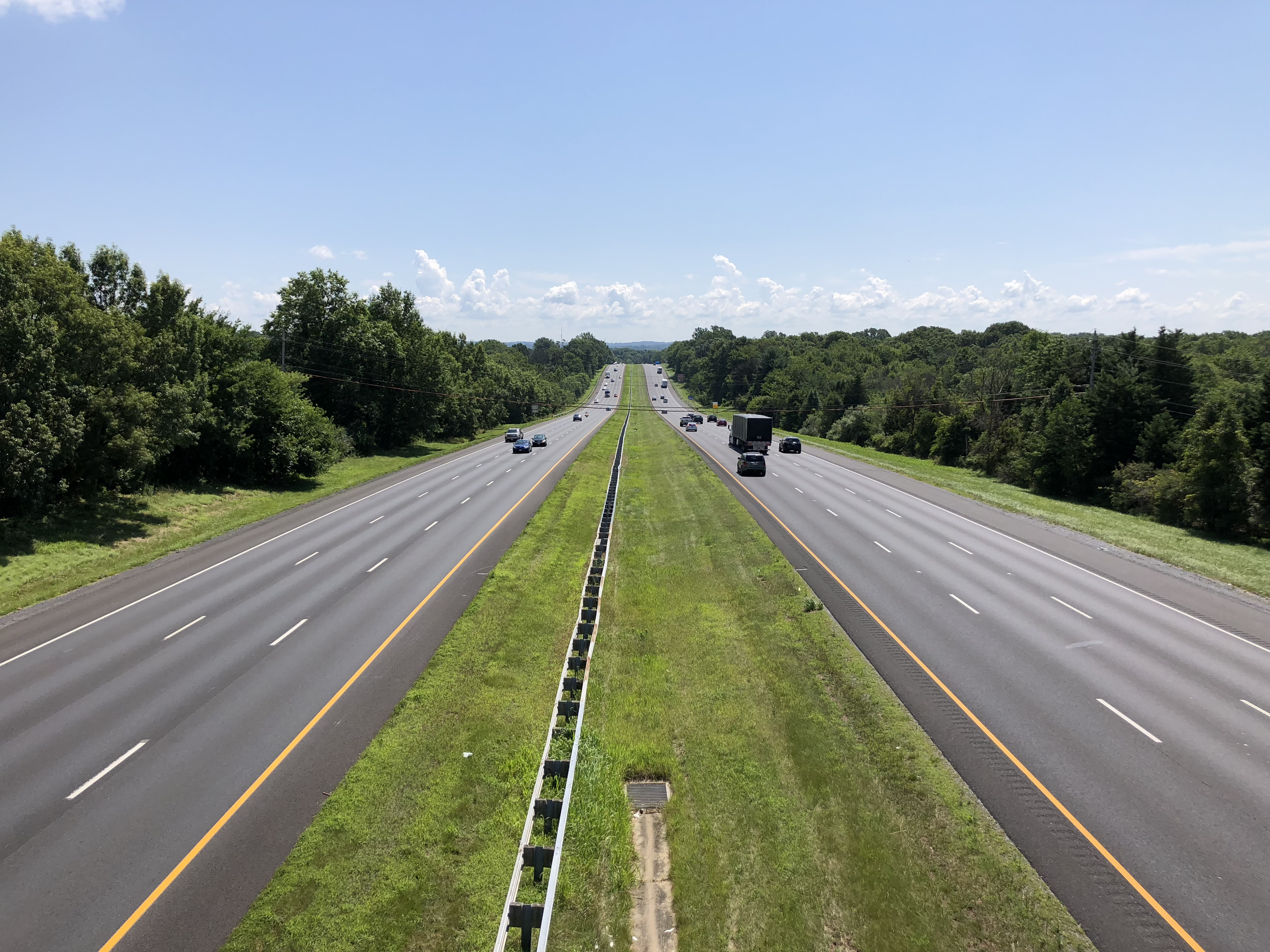
I-70 and US 40 in Frederick County

- I-70
- I-270
- US 15
- US 15 Bus.
- US 40
- US 40 Alt.
- US 340
- MD 17
- MD 26
- MD 27
- MD 28
- MD 31
- MD 75
- MD 76
- MD 77
- MD 79
- MD 80
- MD 85
- MD 140
- MD 144
- MD 180
- MD 194
- MD 355
- MD 355 Bus.
- MD 550

== Demographics ==
Historical population
Census	Pop.	Note	%±
1790	30,791		—
1800	31,523		2.4%
1810	34,437		9.2%
1820	40,459		17.5%
1830	45,789		13.2%
1840	36,405		−20.5%
1850	40,987		12.6%
1860	46,591		13.7%
1870	47,572		2.1%
1880	50,482		6.1%
1890	49,512		−1.9%
1900	51,920		4.9%
1910	52,673		1.5%
1920	52,541		−0.3%
1930	54,440		3.6%
1940	57,312		5.3%
1950	62,287		8.7%
1960	71,930		15.5%
1970	84,927		18.1%
1980	114,792		35.2%
1990	150,208		30.9%
2000	195,277		30.0%
2010	233,385		19.5%
2020	271,717		16.4%
2025 (est.)	302,883	▲	11.5%
U.S. Decennial Census; 1790–1960 1900–1990; 1990–2000 2010 2020

Frederick County has experienced a rapid increase in population since the 1980s, including that of minority groups.

=== Racial and ethnic composition ===
Frederick County, Maryland – Racial and ethnic composition Note: the US Census treats Hispanic/Latino as an ethnic category. This table excludes Latinos from the racial categories and assigns them to a separate category. Hispanics/Latinos may be of any race.
Race / Ethnicity (NH = Non-Hispanic)	Pop 1980	Pop 1990	Pop 2000	Pop 2010	Pop 2020	% 1980	% 1990	% 2000	% 2010	% 2020
White alone (NH)	106,900	138,751	171,966	181,645	183,636	93.12%	92.37%	88.06%	77.83%	67.58%
Black or African American alone (NH)	6,293	7,922	12,253	19,611	27,007	5.48%	5.27%	6.27%	8.40%	9.94%
Native American or Alaska Native alone (NH)	107	273	371	512	401	0.09%	0.18%	0.19%	0.22%	0.15%
Asian alone (NH)	546	1,471	3,235	8,876	13,427	0.48%	0.98%	1.66%	3.80%	4.94%
Native Hawaiian or Pacific Islander alone (NH)	x	x	57	92	154	x	x	0.03%	0.04%	0.06%
Other race alone (NH)	120	78	264	405	1,445	0.10%	0.05%	0.14%	0.17%	0.53%
Mixed race or Multiracial (NH)	x	x	2,467	5,109	13,528	x	x	1.26%	2.19%	4.98%
Hispanic or Latino (any race)	826	1,713	4,664	17,135	32,119	0.72%	1.14%	2.39%	7.34%	11.82%
Total	114,792	150,208	195,277	233,385	271,717	100.00%	100.00%	100.00%	100.00%	100.00%

=== 2020 census ===
As of the 2020 census, the county had a population of 271,717. The median age was 38.7 years. 23.6% of residents were under the age of 18 and 14.9% of residents were 65 years of age or older. For every 100 females there were 95.8 males, and for every 100 females age 18 and over there were 93.5 males age 18 and over. 72.5% of residents lived in urban areas, while 27.5% lived in rural areas.

The racial makeup of the county was 69.7% White, 10.2% Black or African American, 0.4% American Indian and Alaska Native, 5.0% Asian, 0.1% Native Hawaiian and Pacific Islander, 5.3% from some other race, and 9.2% from two or more races. Hispanic or Latino residents of any race comprised 11.8% of the population.

There were 98,358 households in the county, of which 34.7% had children under the age of 18 living with them and 23.1% had a female householder with no spouse or partner present. About 22.3% of all households were made up of individuals and 9.2% had someone living alone who was 65 years of age or older.

There were 103,493 housing units, of which 5.0% were vacant. Among occupied housing units, 74.6% were owner-occupied and 25.4% were renter-occupied. The homeowner vacancy rate was 1.3% and the rental vacancy rate was 6.2%.

=== 2010 census ===
At the 2010 United States census, there were 233,385 people, 84,800 households and 61,198 families residing in the county. The population density was 353.5 per square mile (136.5/km^{2}). There were 90,136 housing units at an average density of 136.5 per square mile (52.7/km^{2}). The racial make-up of the county was 81.5% white, 8.6% black or African American, 3.8% Asian, 0.3% American Indian, 2.9% from other races and 2.8% from two or more races. The total (all races) of those self-identifying as Hispanic or Latino origin made up 7.3%, and those persons who were white alone made up 77.8% of the population. 26.3% of the population cited German ancestry, 17.4% Irish, 12.1% English, 7.2% Italian, and 6.3% American.

Of the 84,800 households, 37.6% had children under the age of 18 living with them, 57.8% were married couples living together, 10.0% had a female householder with no husband present, 27.8% were non-families, and 22.0% of all households were made up of individuals. The average household size was 2.70 and the average family size was 3.17. The median age was 38.6 years.

The median household income was $81,686 and the median family income was $95,036. Males had a median income of $62,494 and females $46,720. The per capita income was $35,172. About 3.2% of families and 4.8% of the population were below the poverty line, including 5.8% of those under age 18 and 5.6% of those age 65 or over.

== Law, government, and politics ==
=== Charter government ===
On December 1, 2014, Frederick County changed to a "charter home rule government".

Voters approved this governmental change at the November 6, 2012, election with 62,469 voting for the transition and 37,368 against. Previously, Frederick County had been governed by a five-member county commission that could only legislate in local matters with the prior consent of the Maryland General Assembly. Even that authority was limited to areas authorized by the General Assembly, enabling legislation, or public local laws. As a charter county, Frederick County is now governed by a seven-member county council, with five elected from districts and two elected at-large. A popularly elected county executive is responsible for providing direction, supervision, and administrative oversight of all executive departments, agencies, and offices. The council has broad power to act on most local matters.

Jan Gardner was elected the first Frederick County executive in 2014 and was re-elected in 2018.

County Executive
Name	Affiliation	Term
Jan Gardner	Democrat	2014–2022
Jessica Fitzwater	Democrat	2022–present

The members of the third Frederick County Council for the term beginning 2022 are:

County Council
Name	Affiliation	District	Region	First elected
Renee Knapp	Democrat	At-large	At-large	2022
Brad W. Young	Democrat	At-large	At-large	2022
Jerry Donald	Democrat	1	Braddock Heights, Middletown, Brunswick	2014
Steve McKay	Republican	2	Monrovia, Urbana, New Market, Mount Airy	2018
M.C. Keegan-Ayer	Democrat	3	Frederick, Clover Hill	2014
Kavonte Duckett	Democrat	4	Frederick, Ballenger Creek, Linganore	2022
Mason Carter	Republican	5	Myersville, Emmitsburg, Thurmont	2022

The Frederick County state's attorney, first elected November 2, 2010, and re-elected in 2018 and 2022, is Charlie Smith, a Republican.

The sheriff of Frederick County is Republican Chuck Jenkins.

Frederick County's fire and rescue service is handled by a combination career and volunteer service delivery system. The county employs over 450 career firefighters. Volunteers of the 26 volunteer fire and rescue corporations number approximately 300 active operational members. Fire, rescue and emergency medical services, including advanced life support, are handled by career staffing supplemented by volunteers. The county has a Maryland State Police Medevac located at the Frederick Municipal Airport and is designated "Trooper 3". Trooper 3 handles calls throughout the state, but provides immediate assistance to local police, fire and rescue services.

=== Politics ===
Frederick County was once, like the rest of Appalachian and German-influenced Western Maryland, staunchly Republican, with Lyndon B. Johnson in 1964 being the last Democrat to carry it in a presidential election until Joe Biden carried the county in 2020. The growth of the county with migration from Washington D.C. had begun to narrow the margins starting from 2008, with John McCain edging out Barack Obama by only 1,157 votes out of over one hundred thousand cast in the 2008 election.

Democratic strength is mostly concentrated in the city of Frederick, whereas Republican strength is located in the northern rural regions of the county. The county's suburbs, historically Republican-leaning, have become competitive in recent years.

Voter registration and party enrollment as of November 2025
Democratic	78,567	37.73%
Republican	69,251	33.26%
Unaffiliated	57,106	27.42%
Other parties	3,311	1.59%
Total	208,235	100%

United States presidential election results for Frederick County, Maryland
Year	Republican		Democratic		Third party(ies)	
Year	No.	%	No.	%	No.	%
1836	3,130	50.94%	3,015	49.06%	0	0.00%
1840	2,958	53.00%	2,623	47.00%	0	0.00%
1844	3,190	51.58%	2,994	48.42%	0	0.00%
1848	3,158	51.26%	2,983	48.42%	20	0.32%
1852	3,204	48.85%	3,342	50.95%	13	0.20%
1856	21	0.30%	3,304	46.87%	3,724	52.83%
1860	103	1.40%	445	6.07%	6,783	92.52%
1864	3,553	60.68%	2,302	39.32%	0	0.00%
1868	3,869	50.36%	3,813	49.64%	0	0.00%
1872	5,186	56.06%	4,065	43.94%	0	0.00%
1876	5,260	51.42%	4,970	48.58%	0	0.00%
1880	5,764	52.13%	5,278	47.73%	16	0.14%
1884	5,497	50.59%	5,204	47.89%	165	1.52%
1888	5,822	50.89%	5,385	47.07%	233	2.04%
1892	5,502	48.12%	5,643	49.35%	289	2.53%
1896	6,352	53.20%	5,214	43.67%	374	3.13%
1900	6,391	51.30%	5,820	46.72%	246	1.97%
1904	5,788	52.83%	5,004	45.67%	164	1.50%
1908	5,966	52.72%	5,158	45.58%	192	1.70%
1912	2,813	24.76%	5,545	48.81%	3,002	26.43%
1916	5,725	47.61%	6,094	50.67%	207	1.72%
1920	9,559	54.57%	7,747	44.22%	212	1.21%
1924	8,441	49.35%	7,740	45.25%	925	5.41%
1928	12,569	62.57%	7,406	36.87%	114	0.57%
1932	7,144	39.64%	10,686	59.29%	194	1.08%
1936	9,500	46.83%	10,722	52.85%	64	0.32%
1940	10,485	48.02%	11,255	51.55%	93	0.43%
1944	11,367	57.13%	8,528	42.87%	0	0.00%
1948	9,934	57.77%	7,142	41.53%	121	0.70%
1952	14,562	64.86%	7,851	34.97%	38	0.17%
1956	14,387	65.38%	7,619	34.62%	0	0.00%
1960	13,408	57.50%	9,910	42.50%	1	0.00%
1964	9,264	38.90%	14,548	61.10%	0	0.00%
1968	13,649	51.87%	8,316	31.60%	4,348	16.52%
1972	19,907	69.48%	8,235	28.74%	509	1.78%
1976	17,941	55.23%	14,542	44.77%	0	0.00%
1980	22,033	56.31%	13,629	34.83%	3,468	8.86%
1984	29,606	68.67%	13,411	31.11%	96	0.22%
1988	32,575	65.32%	17,061	34.21%	231	0.46%
1992	31,290	48.37%	21,848	33.77%	11,553	17.86%
1996	34,494	52.82%	25,081	38.41%	5,728	8.77%
2000	45,350	57.65%	30,725	39.06%	2,586	3.29%
2004	59,934	59.58%	39,503	39.27%	1,157	1.15%
2008	55,170	49.62%	54,013	48.58%	2,003	1.80%
2012	58,798	50.21%	55,146	47.09%	3,171	2.71%
2016	59,522	47.36%	56,522	44.97%	9,633	7.66%
2020	63,682	43.73%	77,675	53.34%	4,258	2.92%
2024	68,753	44.04%	82,409	52.79%	4,952	3.17%

In state-level elections, Republicans in Frederick rebounded to more historical levels in the 2010 Maryland gubernatorial and senatorial elections, giving the Republican Ehrlich–Kane ticket 55% to Democrat O'Malley–Brown's 45. Frederick voters also supported Republican Senate challenger Eric Wargotz over incumbent Democratic Senator Barbara Mikulski by a margin of 51–46, even as Mikulski was winning statewide by a landslide 61–37.

Despite its conservative reputation, Frederick County voted in favor of Maryland Question 6, which legalized same-sex marriage in Maryland. In the 2014 gubernatorial race, Republican Larry Hogan won Frederick County strongly with 63 percent of the vote compared to Democrat Anthony Brown's 35 percent. In the 2018 elections, despite increased support for Hogan, the Democrats experienced significant gains, securing a majority on the County Council and winning District 3B in the House of Delegates. The Senate election also saw incumbent U.S. Senator Ben Cardin win Frederick County with 51.7% of the vote.

After Biden's win in 2020, the trend towards Democrats continued in 2022, as Democrats increased their majority on the County Council by one seat and gubernatorial candidate Wes Moore won the county with over 53% of the vote compared to 43% for Republican and Emmitsburg resident Dan Cox, the first time Frederick County voted for a Democratic gubernatorial candidate since William Donald Schaefer's landslide victory in 1986. In the Senate election also held in 2022, incumbent Democratic Senator Chris Van Hollen won the county 55.3% to 44.6% over Republican Chris Chaffee.

Gubernatorial elections results

Gubernatorial elections results
Year	Republican	Democratic	Third parties
2022	43.19% 46,040	53.46% 56,992	3.34% 3,576
2018	67.67% 72,560	31.11% 33,355	1.22% 1,304
2014	63.34% 50,715	34.57% 27,682	2.09% 1,675
2010	54.74% 41,410	42.59% 32,222	2.67% 2,021
2006	59.57% 43,536	39.19% 28,644	1.24% 908
2002	65.98% 43,646	33.12% 21,913	0.9% 596

=== Public safety ===
The Frederick County Sheriff's Office provides court protection, jail management and morgue operation for the entire county. It provides police patrol and detective services within the unincorporated areas of Frederick County. The entire county entails a population of 222,938 within 662.88 square miles (1,716.9 km^{2}). Frederick City, Brunswick, Mount Airy, Emmitsburg and Thurmont have municipal police departments. Middletown contracts with the Sheriff's Office for its policing.

== Crime ==
The following table includes the number of incidents reported for each type of offense from 2012 to 2019.

Year	Homicide	Forcible sex offense	Assault	Robbery	Burglary	Theft	Motor vehicle theft	Fraud	Arson
2012	0	71	45	9	153	198	5	41	11
2013	▲4	▼50	▼36	▲23	▼139	▼85	▲10	▲46	▲17
2014	▼0	▲61	▼30	23	▲169	▲161	▼3	▼42	▼9
2015	▲4	▼56	▲32	23	▼150	▼124	▲4	▲47	▲10
2016	▼1	▼53	▼31	▲26	▼134	▲142	▲12	▲62	▼4
2017	▲3	▲64	▲35	▼24	134	▲145	▲18	▼57	▲8
2018	▼1	▼52	▼33	▼16	▼103	▲158	▼7	▲85	▼4
2019	1	▲56	▲45	▲17	▼97	▼147	▲18	▼77	▲9

== Economy ==
The U.S. Census Bureau reported the following data for Frederick County, June 6, 2011.

Metric	Frederick County	Maryland
Per capita money income in past 12 months (2013 dollars), 2009–2013	$36,917	$36,354
Median household income, 2009–2013	$84,570	$73,538
Persons below poverty level, percent, 2009–2013	6.1%	9.8%
Private nonfarm establishments, 2013	5,955	135,4211
Private nonfarm employment, 2013	83,799	2,182,2601
Private nonfarm employment, percent change, 2012–2013	1.1%	1.4%
Nonemployer establishments, 2012	16,843	442,314
Total number of firms, 2007	21,430	528,112
Black-owned firms, percent	5.9%	19.3%
Asian-owned firms, percent	3.3%	6.8%
Hispanic-owned firms, percent, 2007	3.6%	4.9%
Women-owned firms	31.1%	32.6%
Manufacturers shipments, 2007 ($1000)	3,003,696	41,456,097
Merchant wholesaler sales, 2007 ($1000)	1,252,142	51,276,797
Retail sales, 2007 ($1000)	3,066,281	75,664,186
Retail sales per capita, 2007	$13,629	$13,429
Accommodation and food services sales, 2007 ($1000)	356,482	10,758,428
Building permits, 2013	1,220	17,918

According to the Maryland Department of Business and Economic Development, the following are the principal employers in Frederick County. This list excludes U.S. post offices and state and local governments, but includes public institutions of higher education.

Employer	Employees (Nov. 2014)
Fort Detrick (including Frederick National Laboratory for Cancer Research)	4,600
Frederick Health	2,696
Wells Fargo Home Mortgage	1,881
Leidos Biomedical Research	1,836
Bechtel	1,578
Frederick Community College	1,055
State Farm Insurance	900
Walmart/Sam's Club	700
AstraZeneca	595
Lonza Walkersville	520
Hood College	519
Mount St. Mary's University	511
UnitedHealthcare	500
McDonald's	499
Giant Food	490
Way Station	480
Costco Wholesale	452
Life Technologies	450
NVR	450
Wegmans Food Markets	445
Home Depot	444
Plamondon Companies	400
Stulz Air Technology Systems	375
Weis Markets	363
RR Donnelley	359
YMCA of Frederick County	350
Canam Steel	333
Giant Eagle	330
Homewood Retirement Centers	300
Toys "R" Us	260
Trans-Tech	260

Frederick County leads Maryland in milk production; the county's dairy herds account for one-third of the state's total. However, the dairy market is unstable, and the county, like the state more broadly, has lost dairy farms.

== Communities ==
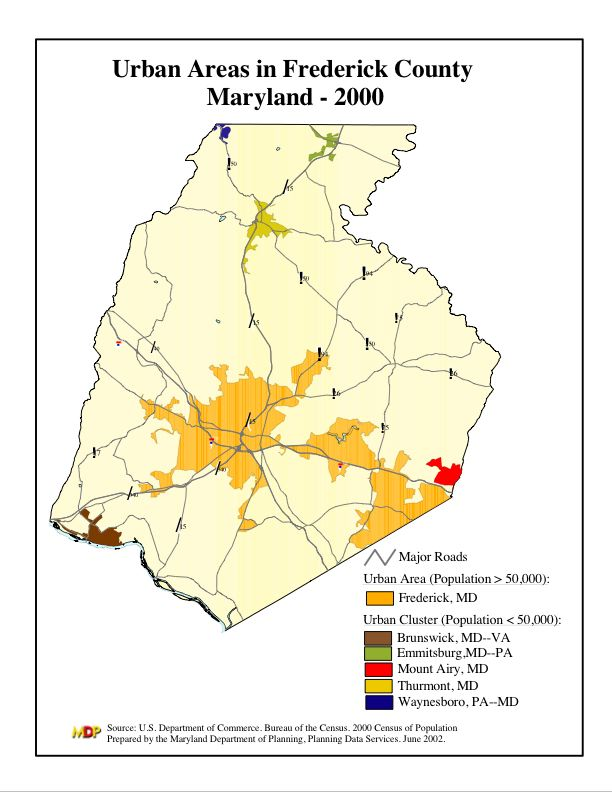
Map of Frederick County's urban areas

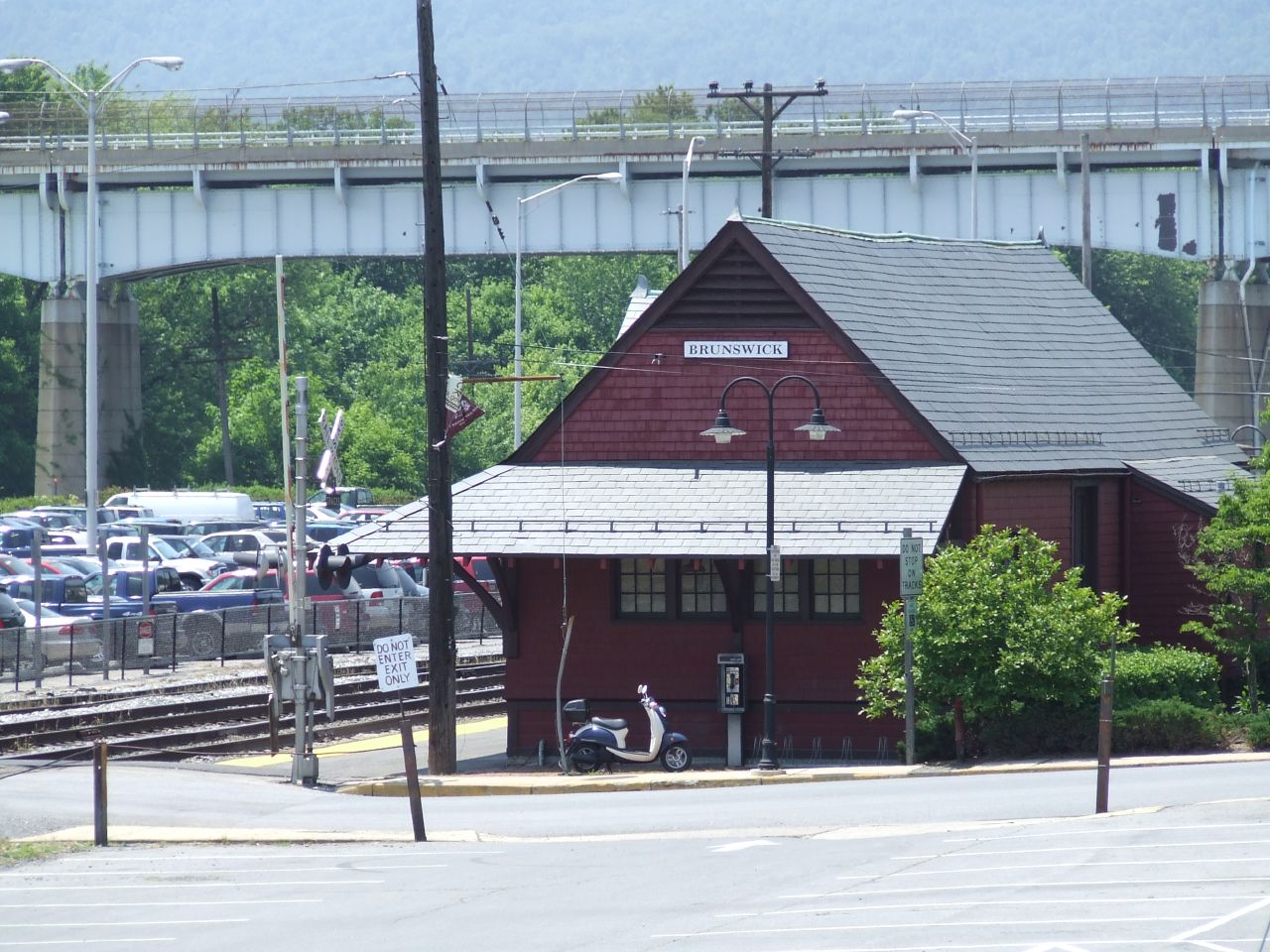
Brunswick

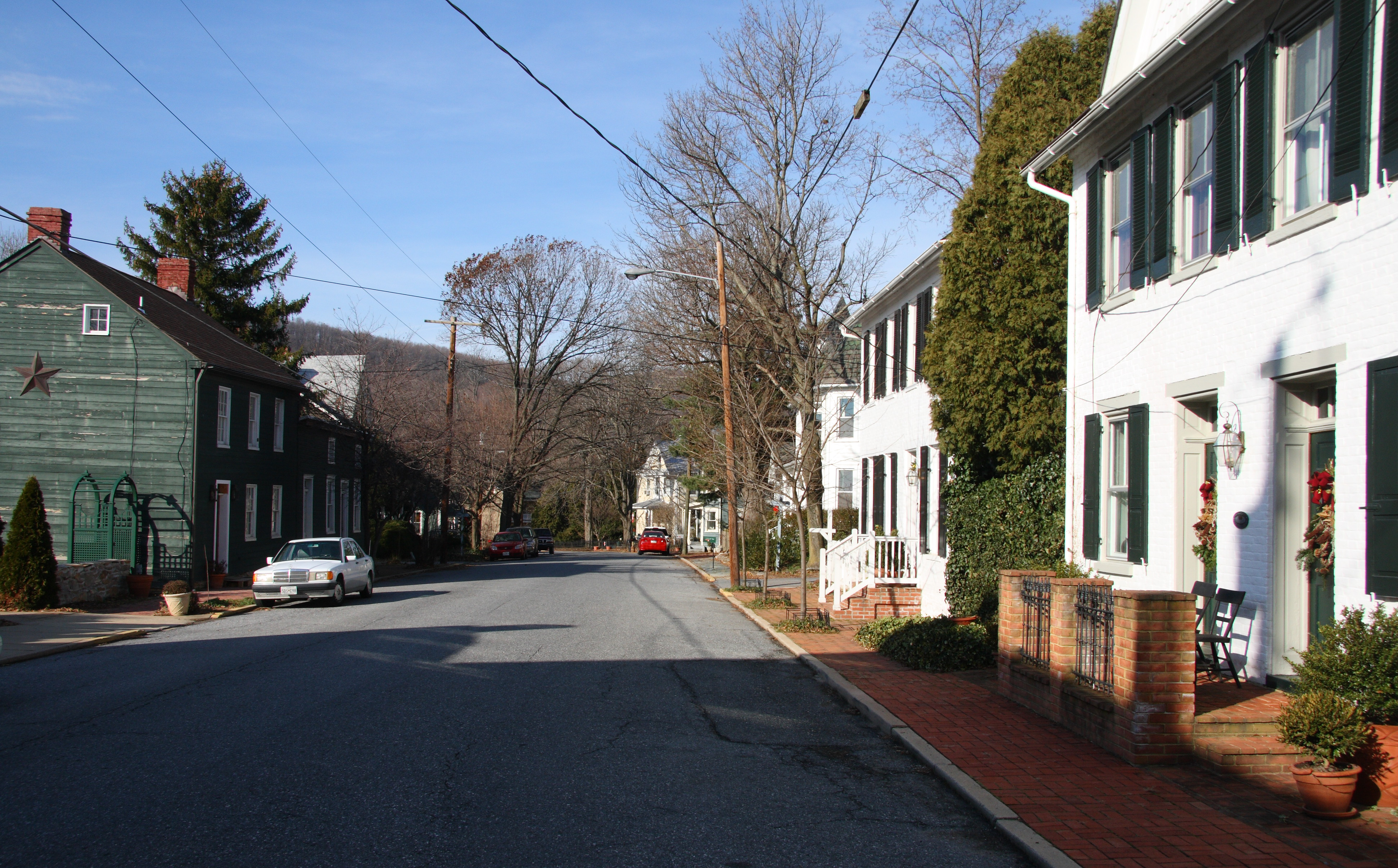
Burkittsville

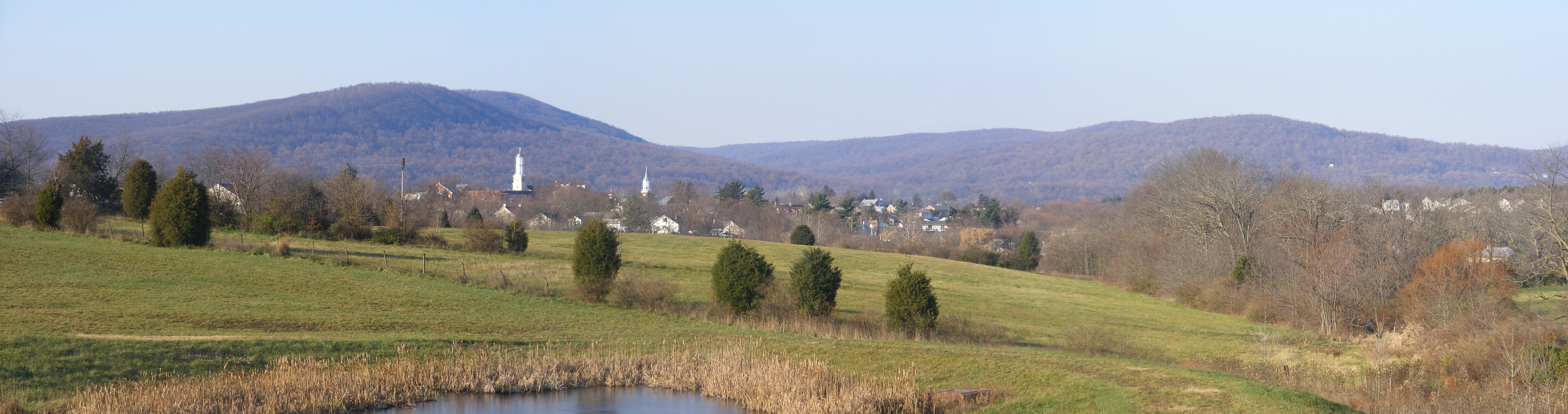
Emmitsburg

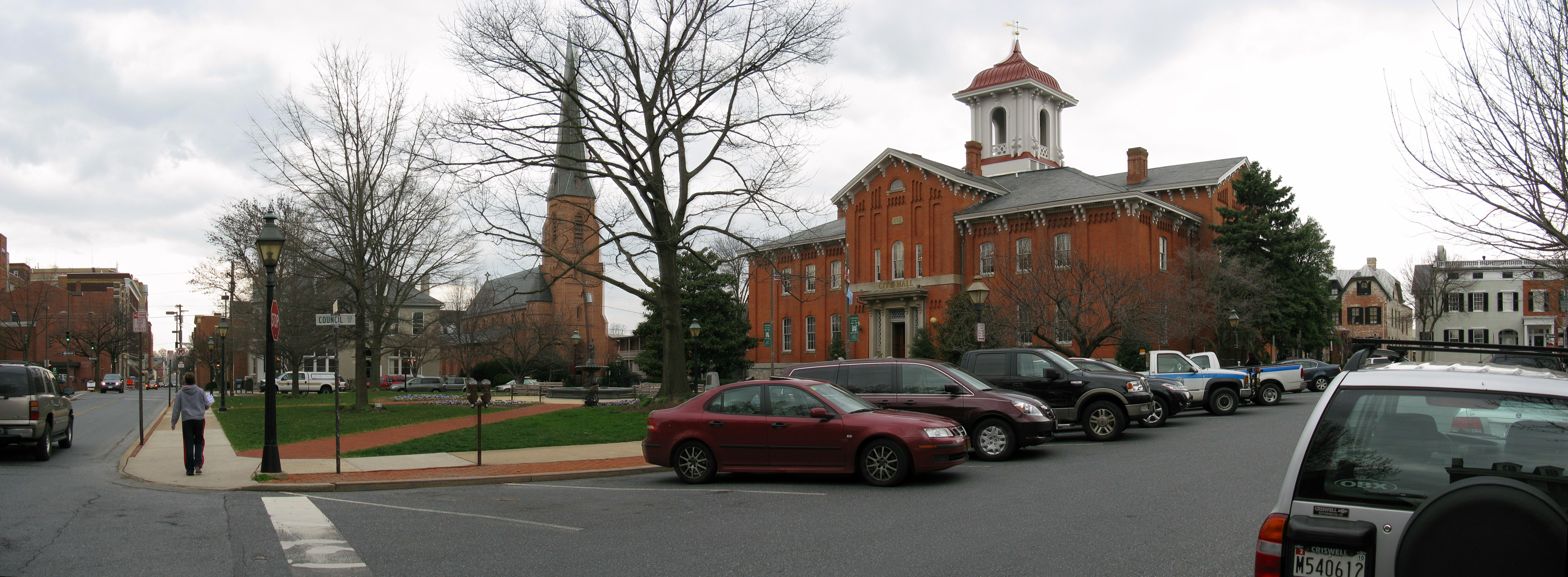
Frederick, the county seat and largest community in Frederick County

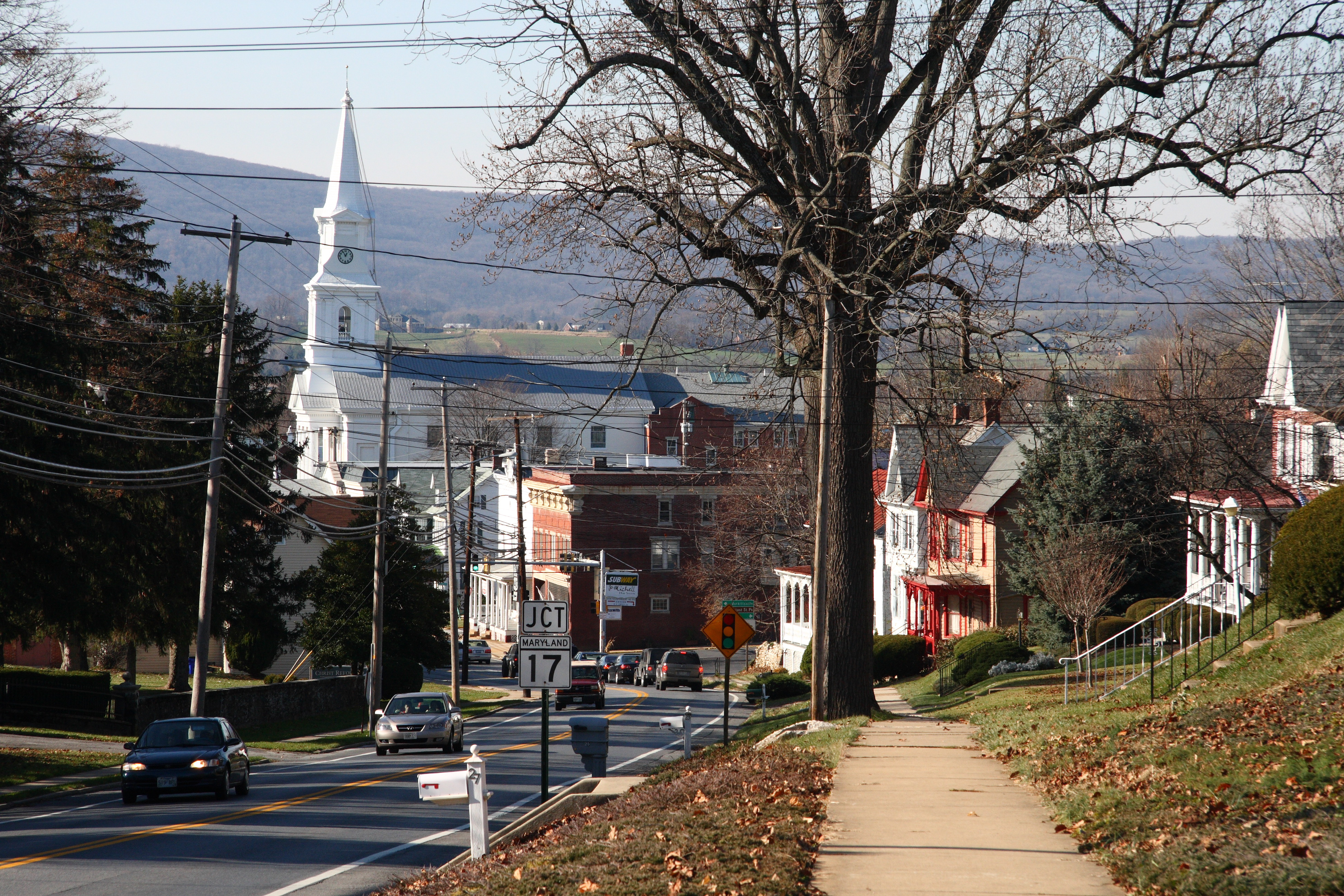
Middletown

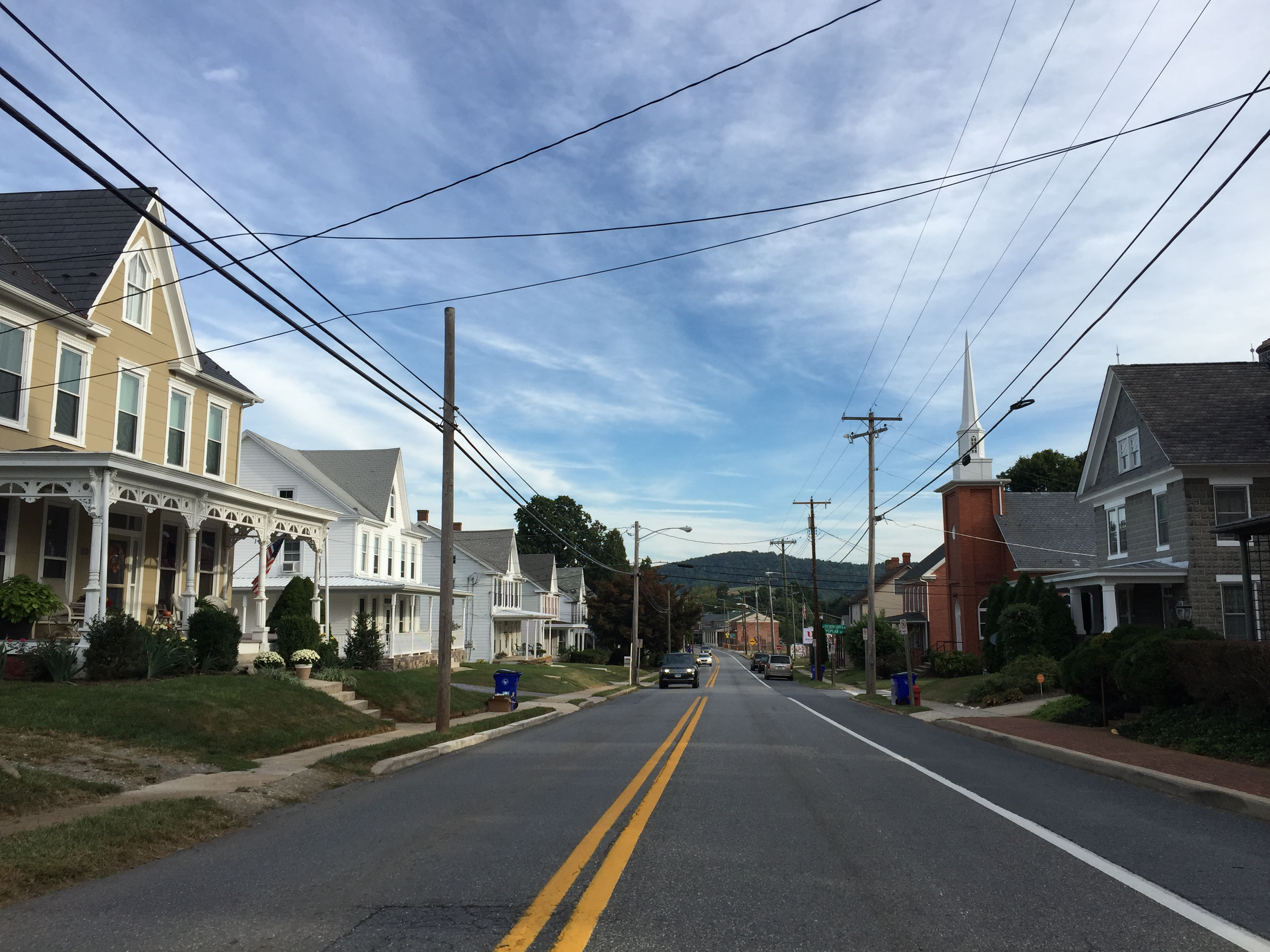
Myersville

=== Cities ===
- Brunswick
- Frederick (county seat)

=== Towns ===
- Burkittsville
- Emmitsburg
- Middletown
- Mount Airy (partly in Carroll County)
- Myersville
- New Market
- Thurmont
- Walkersville
- Woodsboro

=== Village ===
- Rosemont

=== Census-designated places ===
The Census Bureau recognizes the following census-designated places in the county:

- Adamstown
- Ballenger Creek
- Bartonsville
- Braddock Heights
- Buckeystown
- Graceham
- Green Valley
- Jefferson
- Lewistown
- Libertytown
- Linganore
- Monrovia
- Point of Rocks
- Sabillasville
- Spring Ridge
- Urbana

=== Unincorporated communities ===
- Charlesville
- Clover Hill
- Creagerstown
- Discovery
- Garfield
- Ijamsville
- Knoxville
- Ladiesburg
- Lake Linganore
- Linganore
- Mountaindale
- Mount Pleasant
- New Midway
- Petersville
- Rocky Ridge
- Spring Garden
- Sunny Side
- Tuscarora
- Unionville
- Utica
- Wolfsville

== Education ==
The school district for the county is Frederick County Public Schools.

A statewide school for the deaf, Maryland School for the Deaf, is in Frederick.

== Notable people ==
Notable people from Frederick County include:

- Shadrach Bond, first governor of Illinois
- Lawrence Everhart, soldier in the American Revolutionary War
- Barbara Fritchie, Unionist subject of 1863 Civil War poem by John Greenleaf Whittier
- Thomas Johnson, delegate to First Continental Congress and U.S. Supreme Court judge
- Francis Scott Key, wrote "The Star-Spangled Banner" in 1814, which became the U.S. national anthem in 1931
- Adamson Tannehill, soldier and member of the United States House of Representatives
- Roger B. Taney, fifth U.S. Supreme Court chief justice

== See also ==
- National Register of Historic Places listings in Frederick County, Maryland
