= Giant Markets =

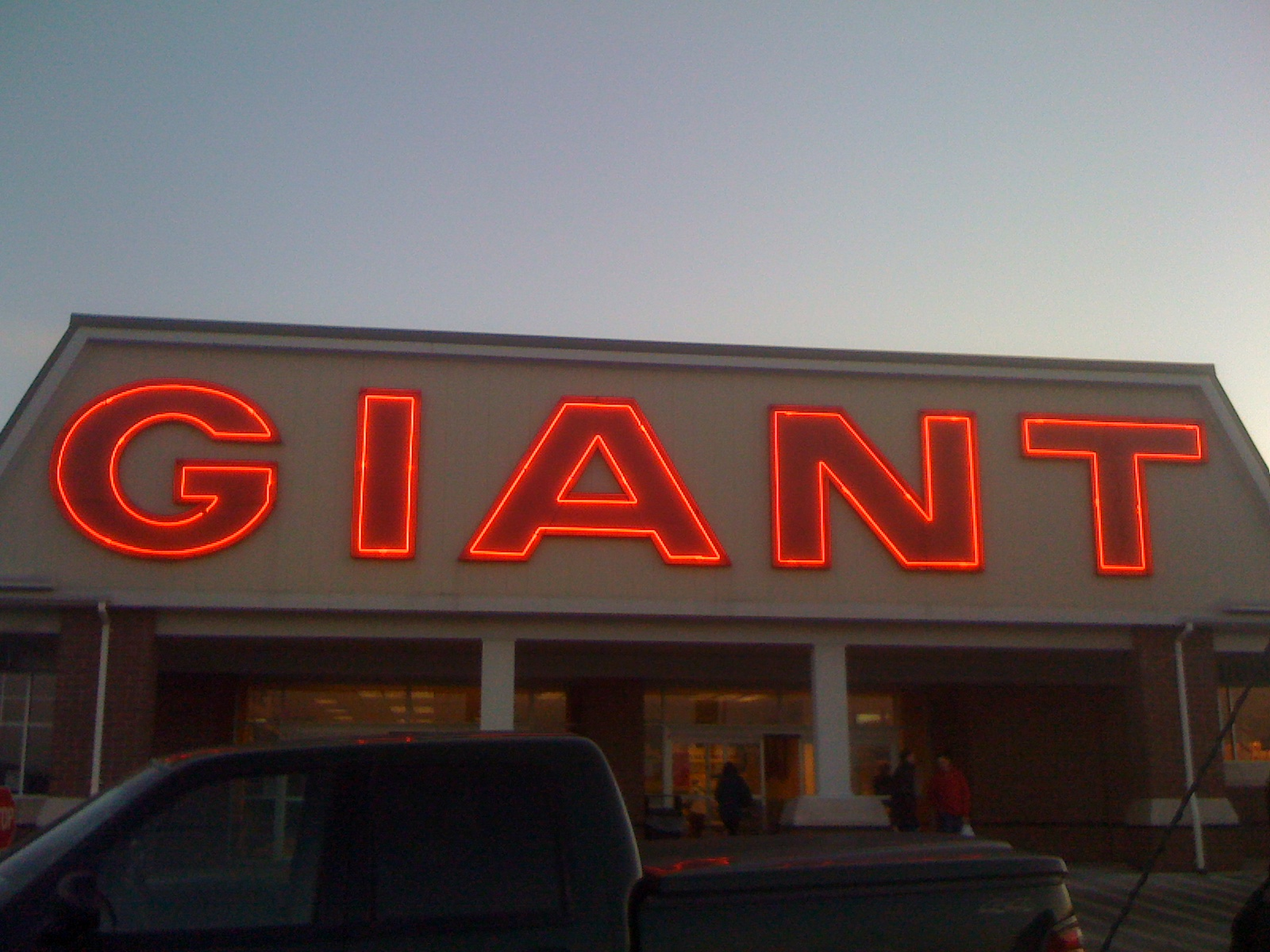
Sign from the former Giant chain still attached to a store in Vestal, NY several months after its takeover by Weis Markets

Giant Markets, also known as Giant Food Markets, was a supermarket chain based in Binghamton, New York. Founded in 1933 by Metrie and George Akel, it was the first self-service supermarket in New York. The company eventually employed over 1,000 employees and operated twelve supermarkets in the Greater Binghamton area. Giant sold its supermarket operations to Weis Markets in August 2009.

== Buy out ==
On Thursday, May 21, 2009, Giant Markets' supermarket operations were purchased by Weis Markets. According to notices received by Giant associates, as of August 23, 2009 their employment ended at Giant Markets, and most of the 1,100 employees were expected to have jobs at Weis. However, many workers were laid off by Weis Markets.

On Wednesday, August 12, 2009, Giant Markets announced that it was closing its store at 56 Main Street in Binghamton effective Saturday, August 15 at 6:00pm, one week prior to the takeover date. All associates at that store were transferred to other Giant Markets locations. The store closure is a decision made by Weis Markets as part of the buyout (it is now a Family Dollar).

Giant Markets in Binghamton, New York is unrelated to Giant Food Stores LLC supermarket chain, based in Carlisle, Pennsylvania, that is a subsidiary of European grocery conglomerate Ahold Delhaize.
