= Discovery, Frederick County, Maryland =

Unincorporated community in Maryland, United States

Discovery, Maryland
- Unincorporated community
- Location within Maryland
- Coordinates: 39°27′55″N 77°21′39″W
- Country: United States
- State: Maryland
- County: Frederick
- Elevation: 338 ft (103 m)
- Time zone: UTC-5 (Eastern (EST))
  - Summer (DST): UTC-4 (EDT)
- Area codes: 301 & 240
- GNIS feature ID: 1711982

Discovery is an unincorporated community in Frederick County, Maryland, United States. Discovery is located along Maryland Route 194 near the southern border of Walkersville. Prior to 2010, the community was part of the Discovery-Spring Garden census-designated place.
