= Charleville =

Charleville can refer to:

== Australia ==
- Charleville, Queensland, a town in Australia
  - Charleville railway station, Queensland

== France ==
- Charleville, Marne, a commune in Marne, France
- Charleville-Mézières, a commune in Ardennes, France
  - Charleville-Mézières station
- Charleville musket, a smoothbore longarm used by the French military in the 18th and early 19th century

== Ireland ==
- Charleville, County Cork, a town in Ireland
  - Charleville railway station
  - Charleville GAA
  - Charleville (Parliament of Ireland constituency)
- Charleville Castle, a castle in County Offaly, Ireland
- Earl of Charleville, an 18th- and 19th-century Irish peerage

== See also ==
- Charlesville (disambiguation)
