= Sunny Side, Maryland =

Unincorporated community in Maryland, United States

- Unincorporated community
- Location in Maryland Sunny; Side (the United States)
- Coordinates: 39°20′39″N 77°31′4″W
- Country: United States
- State: Maryland
- County: Frederick

Sunny Side is an unincorporated community in southwestern Frederick County, Maryland, United States. The village is located between U.S. Route 15 and U.S. Route 340, south of Jefferson and northwest of Adamstown. The Sunny Side United Methodist Church is located in the community.

The community historically has had a predominantly African-American population.
