= Graceham, Maryland =

- Census-designated place
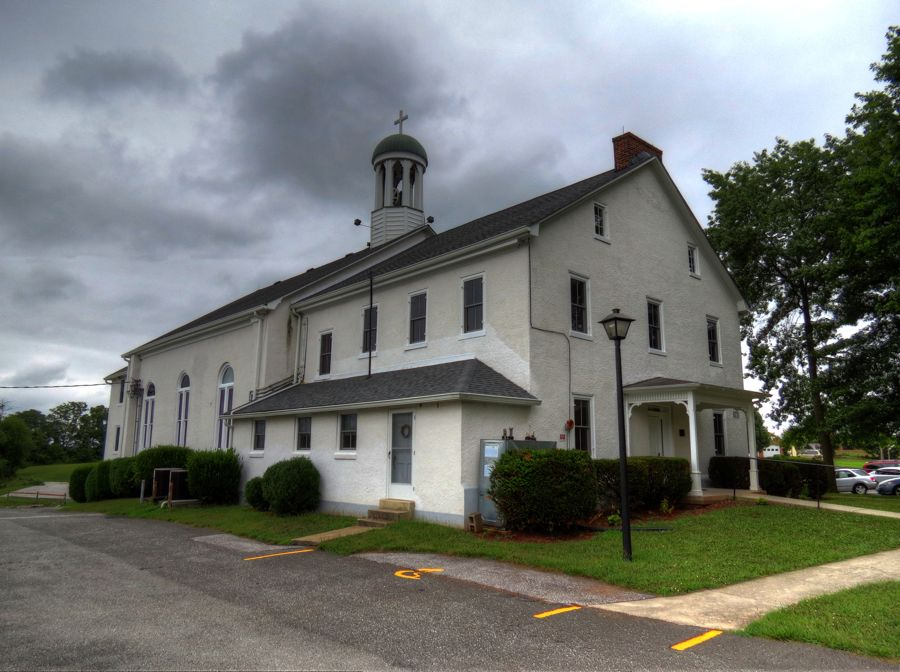
- Graceham Moravian Church and Parsonage

- Location in Maryland Graceham (the United States)
- Coordinates: 39°36′51″N 77°22′53″W
- Country: United States
- State: Maryland
- County: Frederick

Area
  - Total: 0.48 sq mi (1.24 km^{2})
  - Land: 0.48 sq mi (1.24 km^{2})
  - Water: 0 sq mi (0.00 km^{2})
- Elevation: 482 ft (147 m)

Population (2020)
  - Total: 243
  - Density: 507.7/sq mi (196.02/km^{2})
- ZIP code: 21788
- Area codes: 240 and 301
- FIPS code: 24-34350
- GNIS feature ID: 2806297

Graceham is an unincorporated community and a census-designated place (CDP) in Frederick County, Maryland, United States. Graceham is home to Graceham Moravian Church and Parsonage. Per the 2020 Census, the population was 243. In 1973, Graceham began experiencing atypical waves of mass migration of millions of starlings, grackles and other birds which caused environmental damage and distress to residents. The Maryland Forestry Department removed 30-40% of the local pine grove in an attempt to curb the "invasion" of birds, which reduced the migration the following year. However, the solution was not permanent. In 1977, residents and expert witnesses testified before the Senate Economic Affairs Committee in support of legislation that would enable more effective interventions.

== Demographics ==
Historical population
Census	Pop.	Note	%±
2020	243		—
U.S. Decennial Census; 2020

Graceham first appeared as a census designated place in the 2020 U.S. census.

=== 2020 census ===
Graceham CDP, Maryland - Demographic Profile (NH = Non-Hispanic)
Race / Ethnicity	Pop 2020	% 2020
White alone (NH)	216	88.89%
Black or African American alone (NH)	0	0.00%
Native American or Alaska Native alone (NH)	0	0.00%
Asian alone (NH)	1	0.41%
Pacific Islander alone (NH)	0	0.00%
Some Other Race alone (NH)	0	0.00%
Mixed Race/Multi-Racial (NH)	22	9.05%
Hispanic or Latino (any race)	4	1.65%
Total	243	100.00%

Note: the US Census treats Hispanic/Latino as an ethnic category. This table excludes Latinos from the racial categories and assigns them to a separate category. Hispanics/Latinos can be of any race.

== Education ==
It is in Frederick County Public Schools.

School zoning is as follows: It is zoned to Thurmont Primary School, Thurmont Elementary School, Thurmont Middle School, and Catoctin High School.
