= Garfield W. Brown =

American politician (1881–1967)

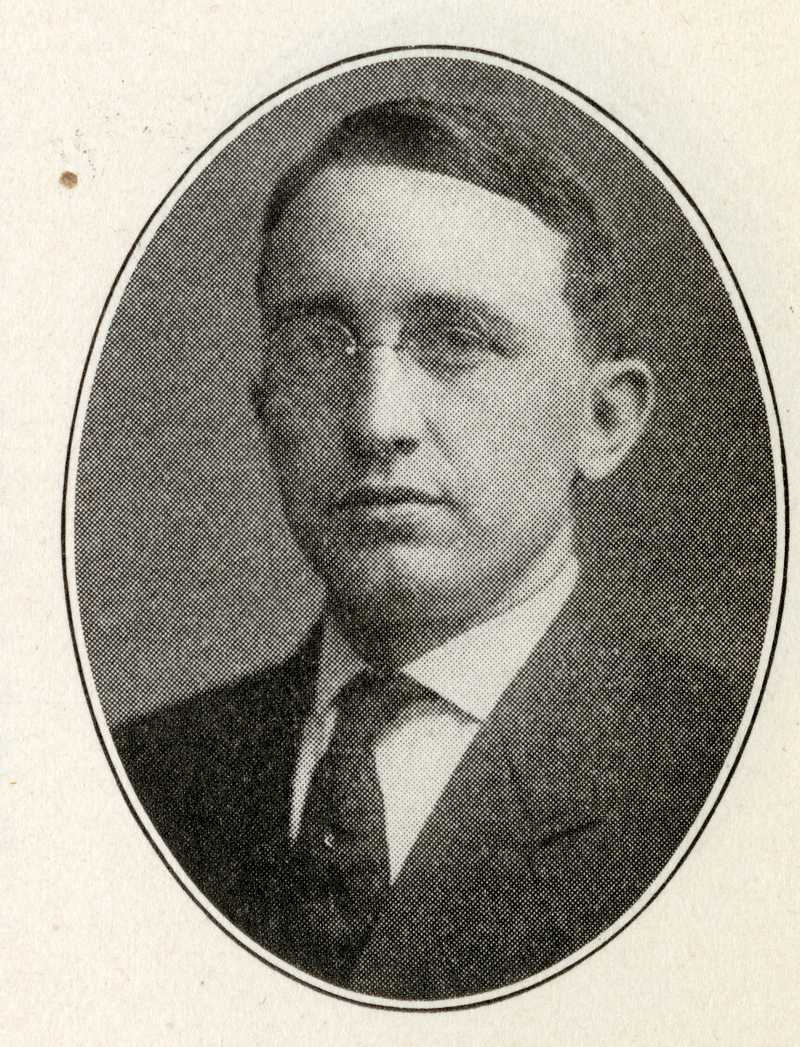

Member of the Minnesota House of Representatives from the 24th district
- In office January 3, 1911 – January 4, 1915

Personal details
- Born: March 15, 1881 Pipestone County, Minnesota, U.S.
- Died: December 24, 1967 (aged 86) Hennepin County, Minnesota, U.S.
- Party: Republican
- Education: Pipestone Area High School; University of Minnesota Law School
- Profession: Politician, lawyer

Garfield W. Brown (March 15, 1881 – December 24, 1967) was an American politician and lawyer who served in the Minnesota House of Representatives from 1911 to 1915, representing the 24th legislative district of Minnesota as a Republican in the 37th and 38th Minnesota Legislatures.

== Early life and education ==
Brown was born in Pipestone County, Minnesota, on March 15, 1881. He attended Pipestone Area High School and the University of Minnesota Law School, graduating from the latter in 1906 with a law degree; he was admitted to the bar that same year.

== Career ==
Brown served in the Minnesota House of Representatives from 1911 to 1915, representing the 24th legislative district of Minnesota as a Republican in the 37th and 38th Minnesota Legislatures.

During his time in office, Brown served on the following committees:

- Appropriations
- Banks and Banking
- Drainage
- Enrollment
- Immigration (1911–1912)
- Insurance
- Judiciary
- Temperance Legislation (1913–1914)

Brown chaired the Enrollment committee during both of his terms.

Brown's time in office began on January 3, 1911, and concluded on January 4, 1915. His district included representation for McLeod County.

Outside of the Minnesota Legislature, Brown was a lawyer.

== Personal life and death ==
Brown resided in Glencoe, Minnesota, at the time he was first elected to the Minnesota Legislature, though was residing in Edina, Minnesota, prior to his death.

Brown died at the age of 86 in Hennepin County, Minnesota, on December 24, 1967. (Note: The Minnesota House Memorial Service lists December 23, 1967, as Brown's date of death.)

== Notes ==
Minnesota House of Representatives
Preceded by —	Member of the Minnesota House of Representatives from the 24th district 1911–1915	Succeeded by —
