= Garfield, Bonner County, Idaho =

Unincorporated community in the state of Idaho, United States

Coordinates: 48°11′03″N 116°25′46″W

Garfield is an unincorporated community in Bonner County, in the U.S. state of Idaho. The community is situated on Garfield Bay, an inlet of Lake Pend Oreille.

== History ==
A variant name is "Midas". A post office called Midas was established in 1909, and remained in operation until 1939.

Midas' population was estimated at 50 in 1960.
