= Charlesville, Maryland =

Unincorporated community in Maryland, United States

- Unincorporated community
- Location within Maryland
- Coordinates: 39°29′17″N 77°25′46″W
- Country: United States
- State: Maryland
- County: Frederick
- Elevation: 397 ft (121 m)
- Time zone: UTC-5 (Eastern (EST))
  - Summer (DST): UTC-4 (EDT)
- Area codes: 301 & 240
- GNIS feature ID: 589940

Charlesville is an unincorporated community in Frederick County, Maryland, United States.
