= Garfield County =

Garfield County is the name of several counties in the United States:

- Garfield County, Colorado
- Garfield County, Montana
- Garfield County, Nebraska
- Garfield County, Oklahoma
- Garfield County, Utah
- Garfield County, Washington

Defunct

- Garfield County, Kansas
