= Garfield, Alberta =

Human settlement in Alberta, Canada

Coordinates: 51.5834°N 114.38531°W

Garfield is a locality in Alberta, Canada.

The community was named after James A. Garfield, 20th president of the United States.
