= Garfield High School =

Garfield High School may refer to:

- Garfield High School (Akron, Ohio)
- Garfield High School (New Jersey), Garfield, Bergen County, New Jersey
- Garfield High School (California), in East Los Angeles, California
- James A. Garfield High School (Garrettsville, Ohio)
- Garfield High School (Seattle), Washington

== See also ==
- Garfield Heights High School, Garfield Heights, Ohio
- Gar-Field Senior High School, Dale City, Virginia
