= Garfield, Maryland =

- Unincorporated community
- Location in Maryland
- Coordinates: 39°36′14″N 77°31′19″W
- Country: United States
- State: Maryland
- County: Frederick
- Elevation: 1,453 ft (443 m)
- Time zone: UTC-5 (Eastern (EST))
  - Summer (DST): UTC-4 (EDT)
- FIPS code: 04-31450
- GNIS feature ID: 590278

Garfield is an unincorporated community in Frederick County, Maryland, United States, situated within the District 6, Catoctin.

Garfield appears on the Myersville U.S. Geological Survey Map and is located in the Eastern Time Zone.

== Garfield United Methodist Church ==
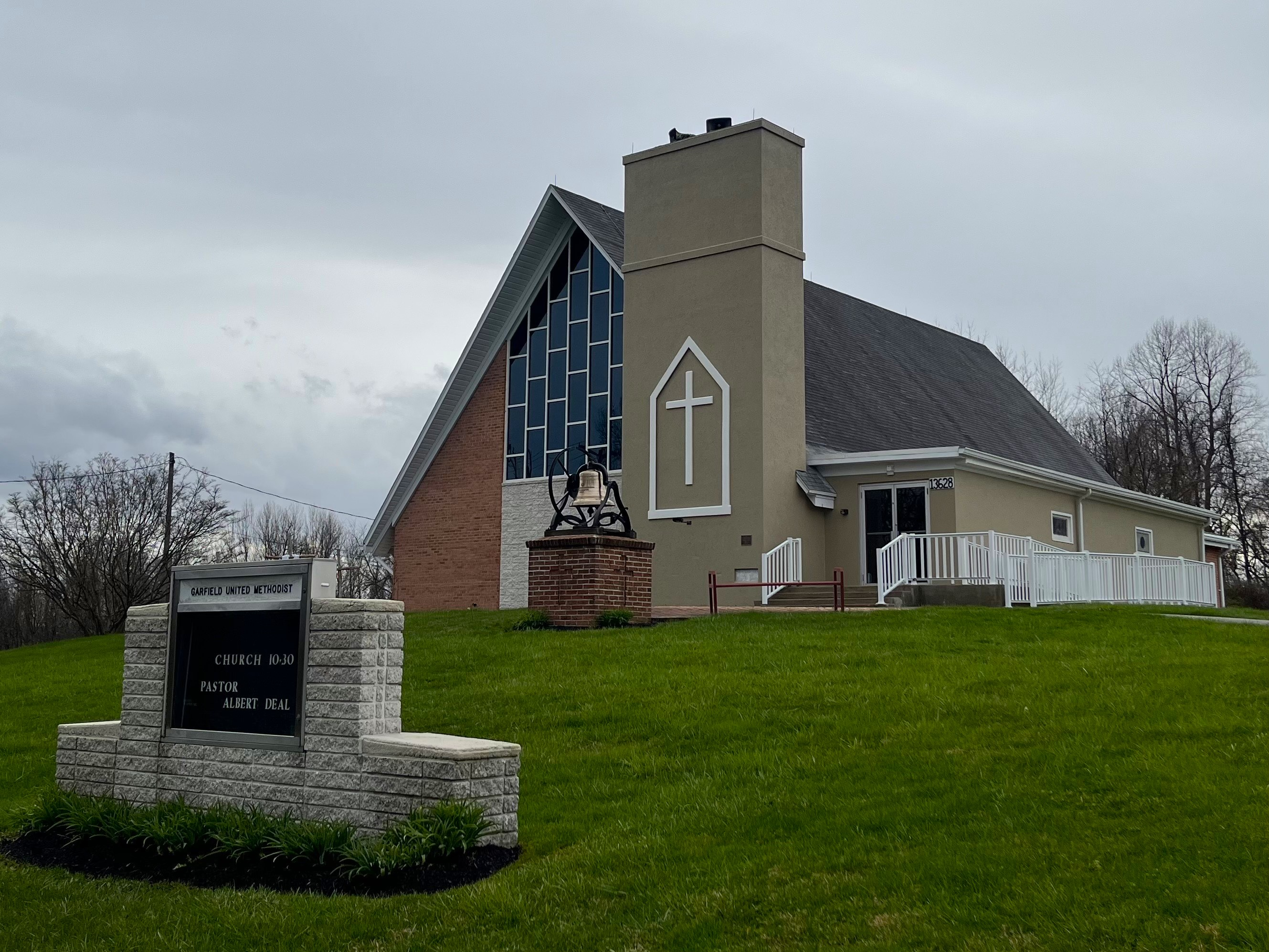
Garfield United Methodist Church is located on Stottlemeyer Road.

One of the few structures in Garfield is the Garfield United Methodist Church. It is relatively small and is located on Stottlemeyer Road.
