= Weis Markets =

American supermarket chain

Weis Markets, Inc.

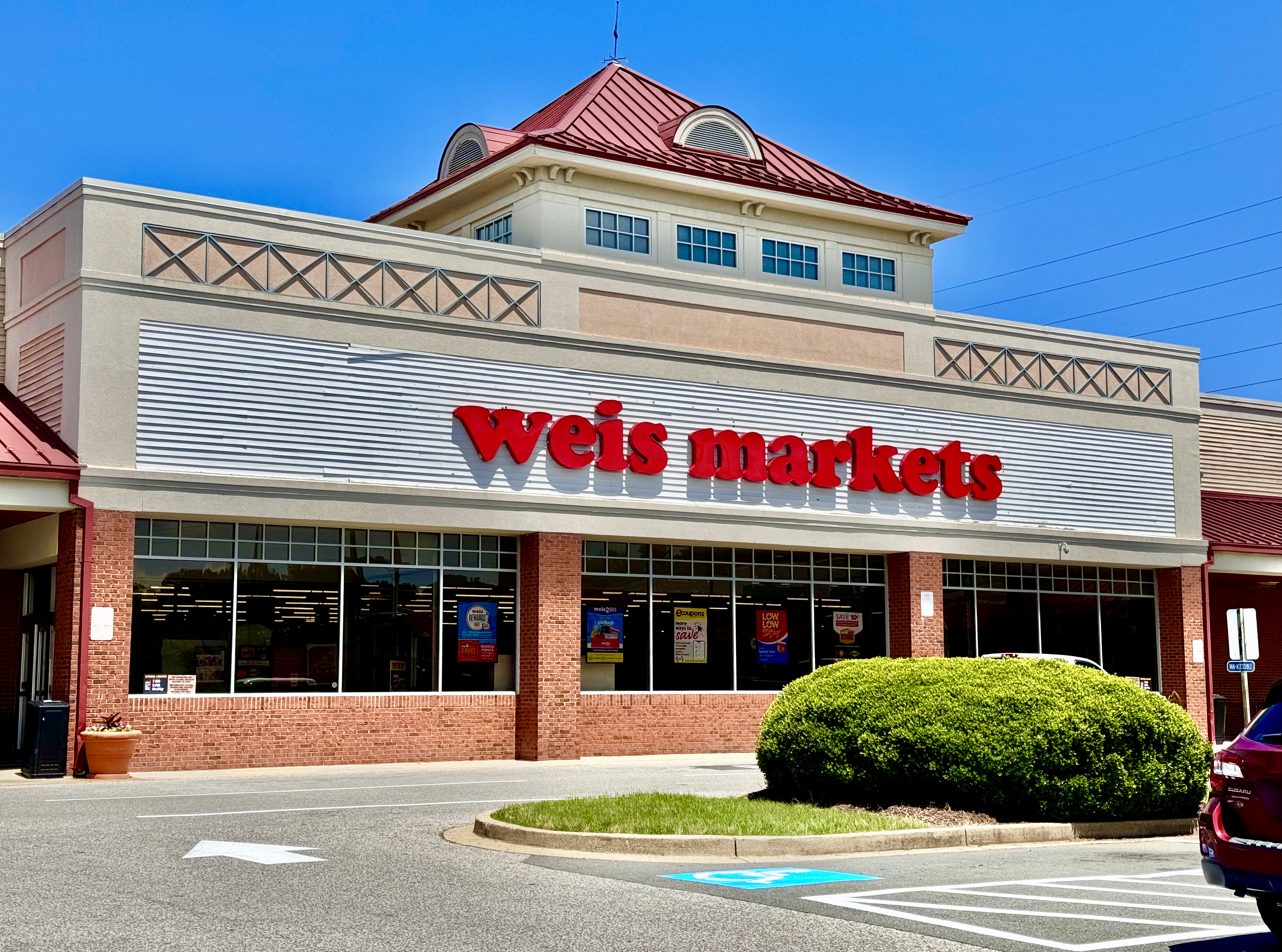
- A Weis Markets location in Solomons, Maryland, formerly a Food Lion.
- Formerly: Weis Pure Foods (1912-1933)
- Type: Public
- Traded as: NYSE: WMK; Russell 2000 Index component
- Industry: Retail grocery
- Founded: 1912; 114 years ago (Sunbury, Pennsylvania, U.S.)
- Founders: Harry and Sigmund Weis
- Headquarters: Sunbury, Pennsylvania, U.S.
- Number of locations: 200
- Areas served: Pennsylvania; Maryland; New York; New Jersey; West Virginia; Virginia; Delaware
- Key people: Jonathan Weis, chairman, president and CEO
- Products: Bakery, delicatessen, seafood, meat, produce, snacks, drinks, frozen foods, health & beauty, general merchandise, pharmacy
- Revenue: ▲US$3,543.3 Million (2020)
- Operating income: ▼US$76.4 million (2017)
- Net income: ▲US$98.4 million (2017)
- Total assets: ▲US$1. 441 million (2017)
- Total equity: ▲US$992.8 million (2017)
- Owner: Weis Family (65%)
- Number of employees: 23,000 (2017)
- Website: www.weismarkets.com

Weis Markets, Inc. (/waɪs/, /waɪz/), doing business as Weis and stylized as weis, is an American food retailer headquartered in Sunbury, Pennsylvania. It currently operates 200 stores with over 23,000 employees in Pennsylvania, Maryland, New York, New Jersey, West Virginia, Virginia, and Delaware.

== History ==
=== 20th century ===
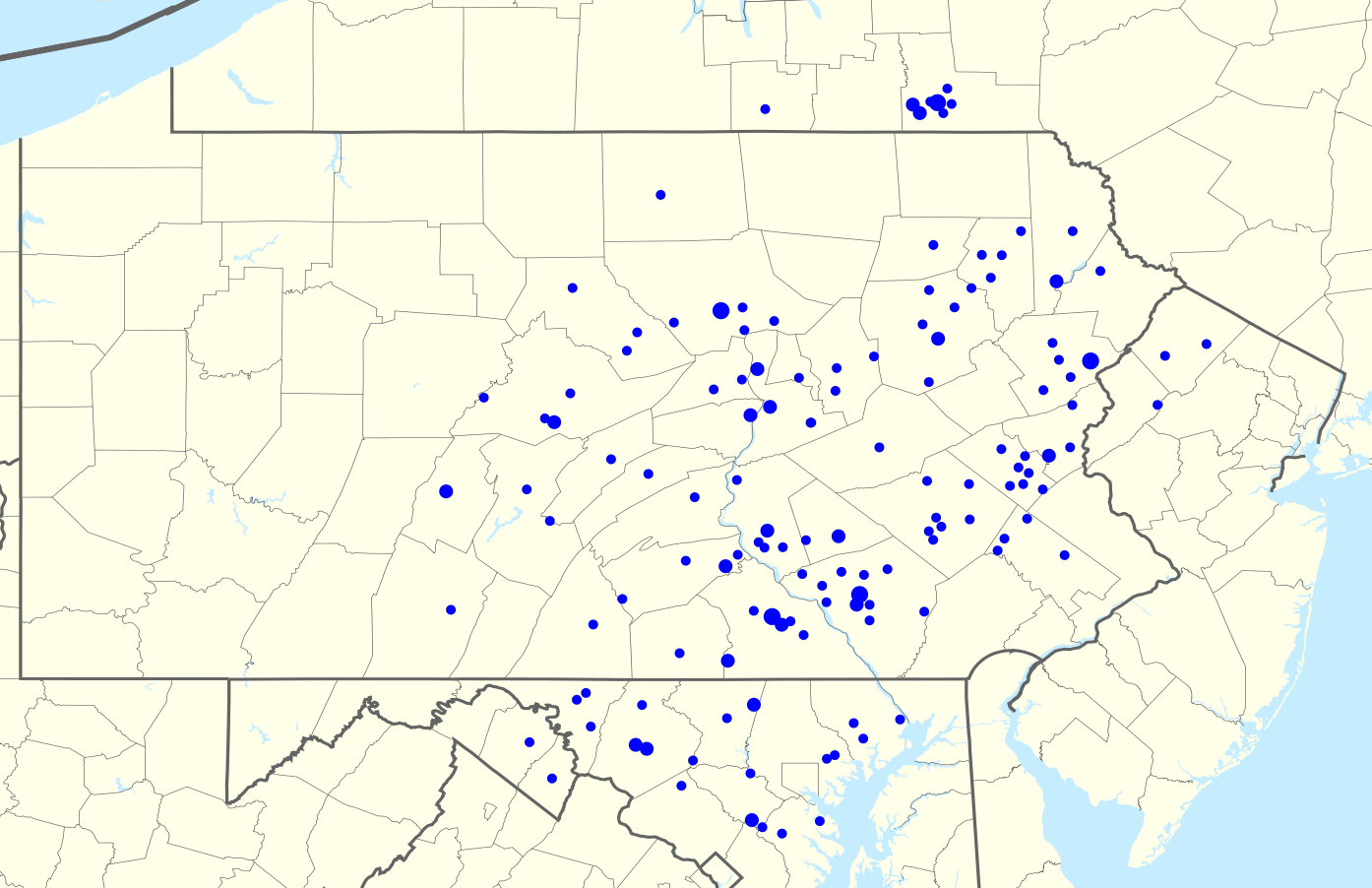
A map of Weis stores as of 2011

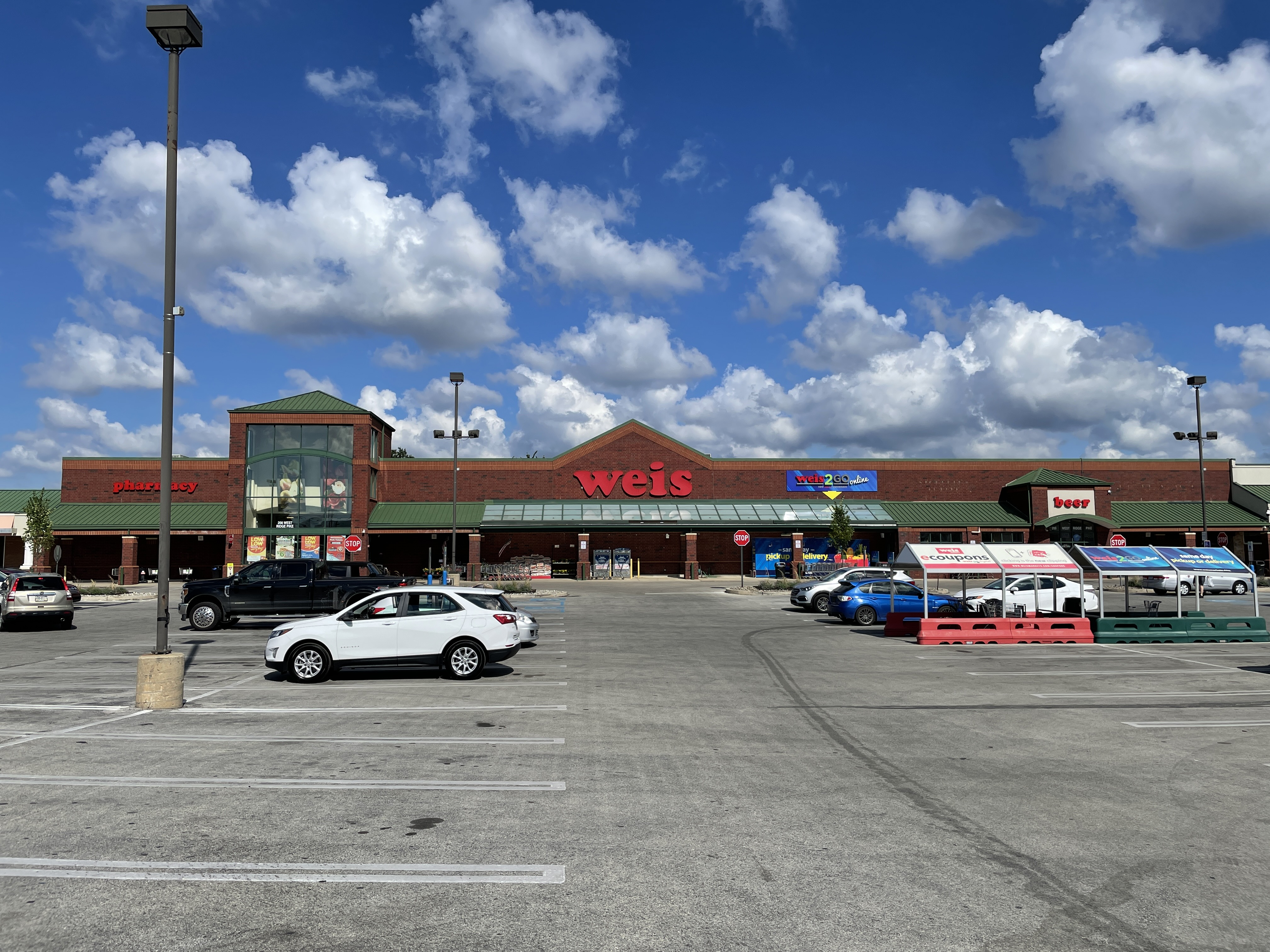
Weis Markets location in Conshohocken, Pennsylvania, formerly a Genuardi's

Weis Markets was founded as Weis Pure Foods in 1912 in Sunbury, Pennsylvania, by two brothers, Harry and Sigmund Weis. Their store has been noted as "revolutionary" since it did not operate on credit; sales were only for cash. At the time, similar stores operated on credit, allowing customers to build a tab that would be paid periodically. Cash sales were a sign of a growing working class earning steady paychecks, and they also helped lower prices by up to 25%.

Three years later, in 1915, a second Weis store opened in Harrisburg, Pennsylvania.

The Weis brothers expanded the chain rapidly, opening dozens of small, in-town grocery stores throughout central Pennsylvania, ultimately peaking at 115 stores in 15 central Pennsylvania counties in 1933.

As the supermarket industry shifted to larger, self-service stores, Weis adapted the format of its stores. The company closed several corner grocery stores in Harrisburg in 1938, replacing them with their first self-service, consolidated supermarket. In newspaper ads during the 1940s, Weis referred to its stores first as Weis Super Markets, then Weis Self-Service Markets, and finally Weis Markets.

Over the next two decades, the company continued with this strategy, and it had consolidated all of its corner grocery stores into supermarkets, with 35 stores by 1955.

In the 1950s and 1960s, Weis expanded its reach, first to York and then Lancaster by 1960. Weis expanded to Maryland in July 1967, opening its first non-Pennsylvania store in Hagerstown, followed by a store in Frederick in August Its first store in the Wilkes-Barre area opened in 1967.

In November 1967, the company purchased the five-store Albany Public Markets chain based in Albany, New York, in an all-cash transaction. It operated Albany Public Markets as a subsidiary, keeping the company's management team intact. Weis closed its Albany Public Markets chain in October 1986, leasing the nine stores to Grand Union.

Weis also expanded to Western Pennsylvania, opening stores as far west as Altoona, Everett, and Philipsburg, and expanded throughout Northeastern Pennsylvania. The company purchased two regional chains in the Poconos and Lehigh Valley region: Mr. Z's, a 14-store chain of IGA supermarkets, in 1992, and King's, a six-store chain based in Hamburg, in 1994. Mr. Z's and King's were operated under separate banners for years before all stores were re-branded as Weis. The westernmost extent of Weis's expansion is along old route 220 with the two stores in Altoona, one on 7th street and one in Park Hills.

Weis's expansion into the Baltimore market was successful, but expansions into the Washington, D.C. market were less successful. Weis opened stores in Northern Virginia before retreating from that market, first closing most of its stores in Montgomery County, Maryland, and finally closing all stores in Virginia.

Weis also expanded into North Jersey, beginning with a store opened in Newton in 1992.

=== 21st century ===
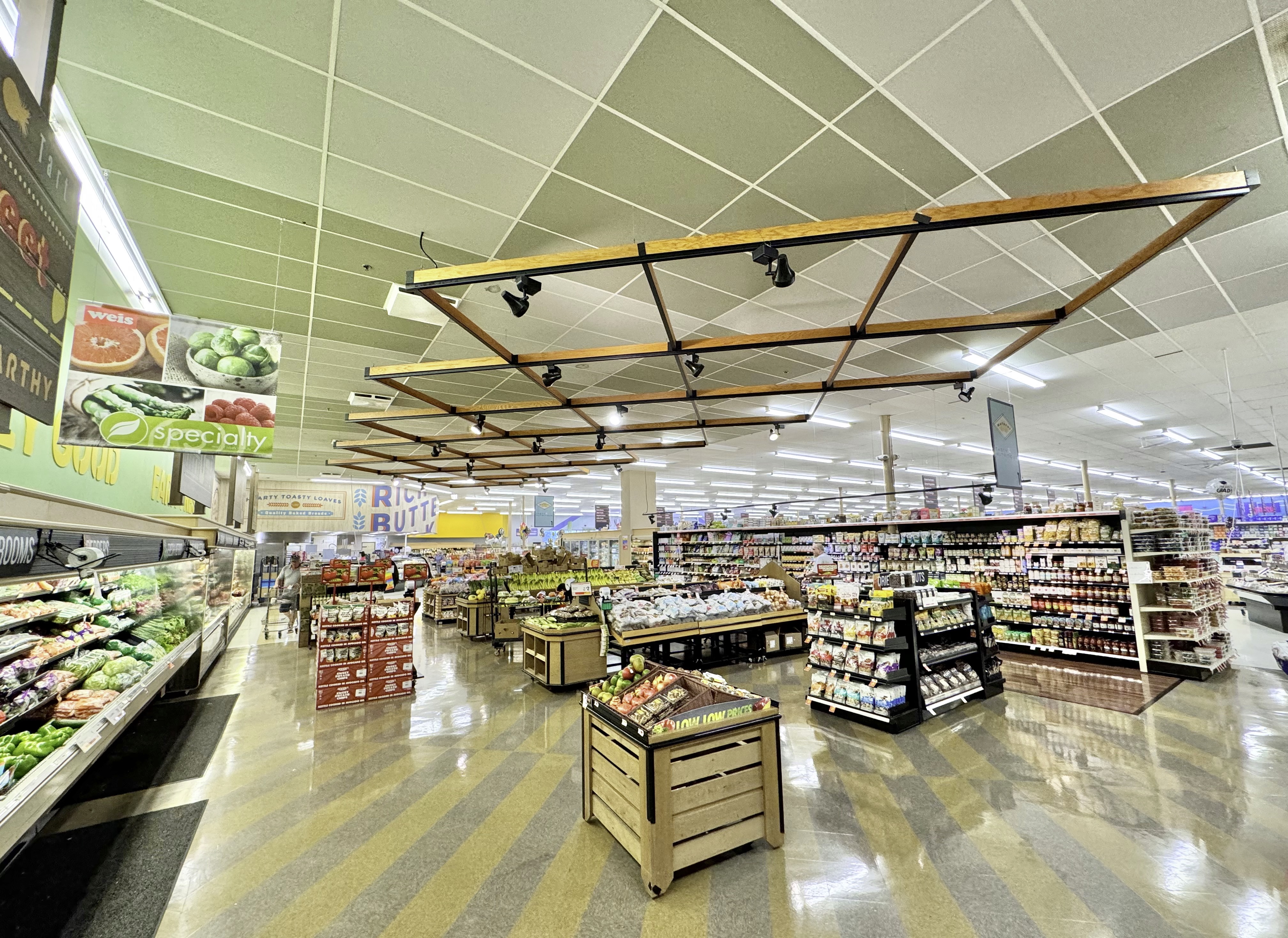
The produce section of a Weis Markets location

In 2000, another New Jersey store opened in Flanders; it closed in 2002, two years after its opening. Weis returned to Flanders in 2014, in a former A&P store adjacent to the location of its first Flanders store.

In 2009, Weis expanded into the Southern Tier of New York with the acquisition of the 11-store Giant Markets chain. Weis closed one former Giant Market in Binghamton in 2012, along with two others in 2014. Eight former Giant Markets continue to operate.

In 2012, eastern expansion continued as Weis acquired three former Genuardi's stores from Safeway, in the Philadelphia suburbs of Conshohocken, Doylestown and Norristown, on June 16. The Doylestown store closed in 2026. A former Superfresh store in Towson, Maryland, opened as a Weis in 2012. Weis entered central New Jersey with the purchase of a former Pathmark store in Hillsborough in August 2013.

In November 2013, Weis opened its closest store to Philadelphia following its acquisition of a former Pathmark store in Huntingdon Valley, Pennsylvania. In July 2015, Weis purchased the location and assets of Nell's Shur-fine Market from C&S Wholesale Grocers in Penn Township, York County, Pennsylvania and followed that up in October 2016 with the purchase of a second Nell's location in East Berlin, Pennsylvania.

Robert F. Weis, the son of Harry Weis, died in October 2015 at the age of 96. A philanthropist, Weis donated millions of dollars to charities, food banks, and other organizations in Sunbury, the Central Susquehanna Valley, and elsewhere. A strong supporter of Israel, he sponsored a flight of Jewish survivors of the Chernobyl disaster to make aliyah, and served as treasurer of the Sunbury chapter of the United Jewish Appeal. Weis was a member of Sunbury's Congregation Beth El and he helped found the Department of Judaic Studies at Yale University.

In May 2016, Weis Markets announced the purchase of five stores from Mars in Baltimore County, Maryland, after that chain announced it was closing all its stores. In July 2016, it was announced that Weis Markets entered into a purchase agreement with Ahold and Delhaize Group for 38 Food Lion locations in Maryland, Delaware, and Virginia as part of the divestiture of stores to gain clearance from the Federal Trade Commission for the impending Ahold/Delhaize merger. The company completed the acquisition and conversion of the stores in early November 2016.

On March 9, 2017, Weis Markets opened a 65,000-square-foot (6,039 m^{2}) store in Hampden Township, Pennsylvania, that features a pub, ice cream parlor, expanded takeout food selection, a drive-thru pharmacy, and a beer cafe selling 900 varieties of beer and 500 varieties of wine. In late September 2019, Weis acquired two Thomas' Food Market stores, one in Dallas, Pennsylvania and another in Shavertown, Pennsylvania, reopening the Dallas location under the Weis banner and closing the Shavertown location.

On July 19, 2018 Weis Markets opened a second store in Morris County NJ in the town of Randolph (where a former A&P used to operate before A&P's bankruptcy in 2015).

=== Legal case ===
The Weis supermarket located in Park Hills Plaza along U.S. Route 220 in Altoona, Pennsylvania, was the subject of a key 1960s United States Supreme Court case concerning the "public forum doctrine." The Court held that a union picket in the supermarket parcel pickup area and parking lot was permissible because the "shopping center here is clearly the functional equivalent to the business district" of a city. At the time of the picketing, the Weis store was located in Logan Valley Mall, the Park Hills Plaza was not built until the mid-1970s, at which time Weis moved across U.S. Route 220 to its current location.

=== Shooting ===
In the early hours of June 8, 2017, employees at a Weis Markets supermarket in Eaton Township, Pennsylvania, United States, were stocking and closing the store for the night. Shortly before 1:00 a.m., 24-year-old Randy Stair barricaded the exits of the store and proceeded to shoot and kill three of his co-workers before fatally shooting himself over the belief that he would be reborn as a "ghost girl" character from Danny Phantom.

== Banners ==
In addition to the Weis Markets banner, the company once operated supermarkets under the King's and Mr. Z's banners. Those two banners were centered primarily in the Lehigh Valley and the Poconos, respectively, and were acquired in 1993 (Mr. Z's) and 1994 (King's). Since their acquisitions, these stores have been remodeled or replaced. In 2009, they were rebranded to the Weis banner, as was its Cressler's store in Shippensburg. In 2011, it converted its three Scot's Lo-Cost stores, a warehouse store concept, located in Montoursville, Mill Hall, and Coal Township, to the Weis banner.

At one time, the company operated a few stores as Big-Top Market, but as of 2006, no more stores exist under this banner.

Weis Markets owned a majority-stake in, and operated, a chain of pet supply warehouse stores called SuperPetz. The first SuperPetz store opened in 1991 in Dayton, Ohio. Weis Markets acquired an 80% stake in the chain in late 1993. Some stores included grooming services, dog training, and veterinary clinics. While their now-defunct website indicated they had 33 pet stores in eleven states in 2003, their footprint shrunk to only seven stores in June 2011, all of which were in Pennsylvania. None remain today.

== Private brand labels ==
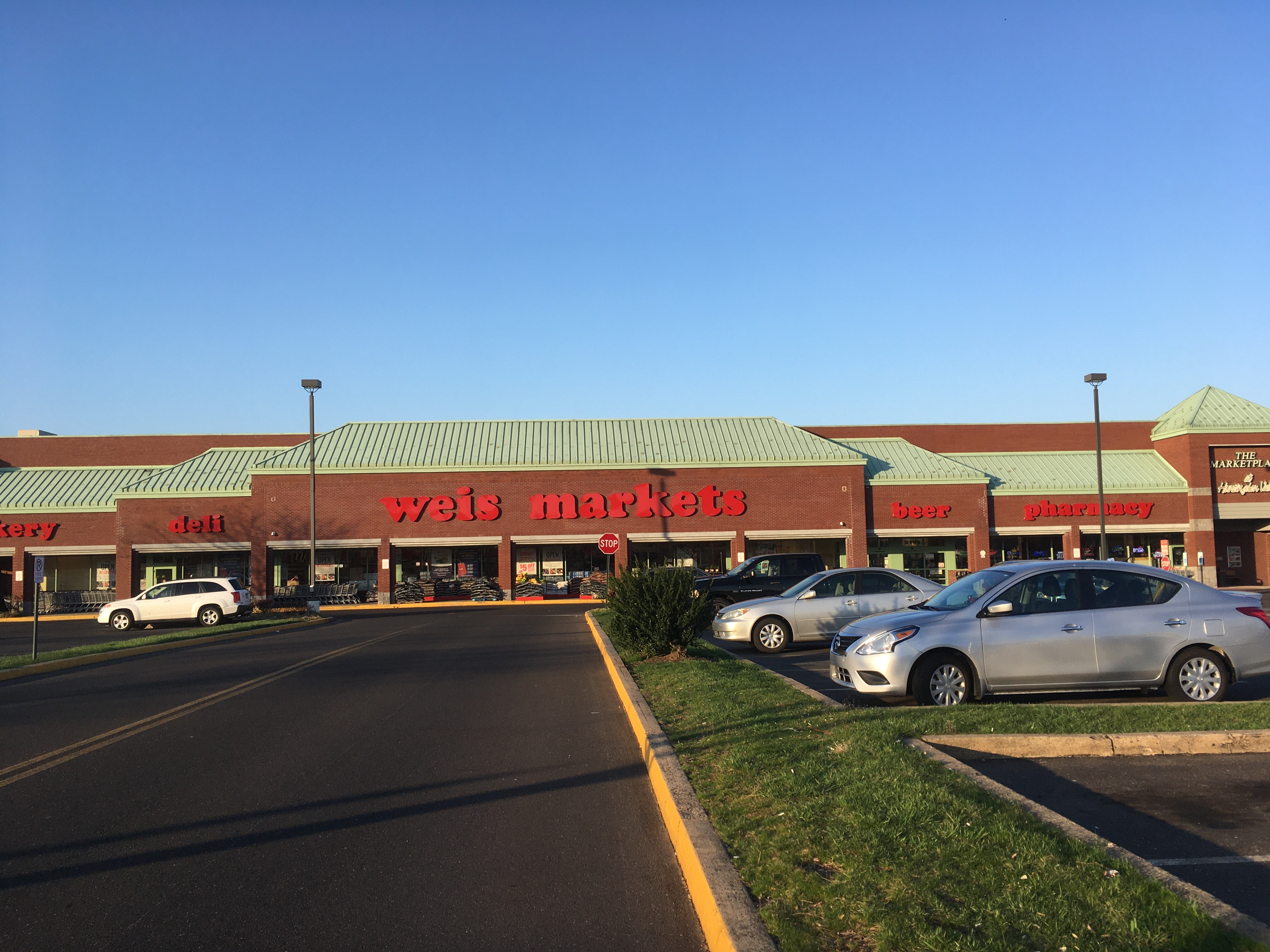
Weis Markets store in Huntingdon Valley, Pennsylvania, formerly a Pathmark

Weis Markets sells a variety of house brands under the following private brand labels:

- Weis Quality (Advertised as equivalent to national brands)
- Weis Organic (Organic Fruits and Vegetables)
- Weis Signature (Premium)
- Weis Quality Premium Meats (Deli Meat)
- Paws Premium (Dog food)
- TopCare (Health and Beauty Care Products)
- Full Circle (Fair-Trade Certified food)
- Weis 360 (Organic staples such as oatmeal and bread)
- Weis Simply Great
