= Garfield, Jefferson County, Idaho =

Unincorporated community in the state of Idaho, United States

Coordinates: 43°38′07″N 111°57′50″W

Garfield is an unincorporated community in Bonneville and Jefferson counties, in the U.S. state of Idaho.

== History ==
Garfield was originally settled chiefly by Mormons. The community was named after James A. Garfield, 20th President of the United States.
