= Garfield Farm and Inn Museum =

- Garfield Farm and Tavern
- U.S. National Register of Historic Places
- U.S. Historic district
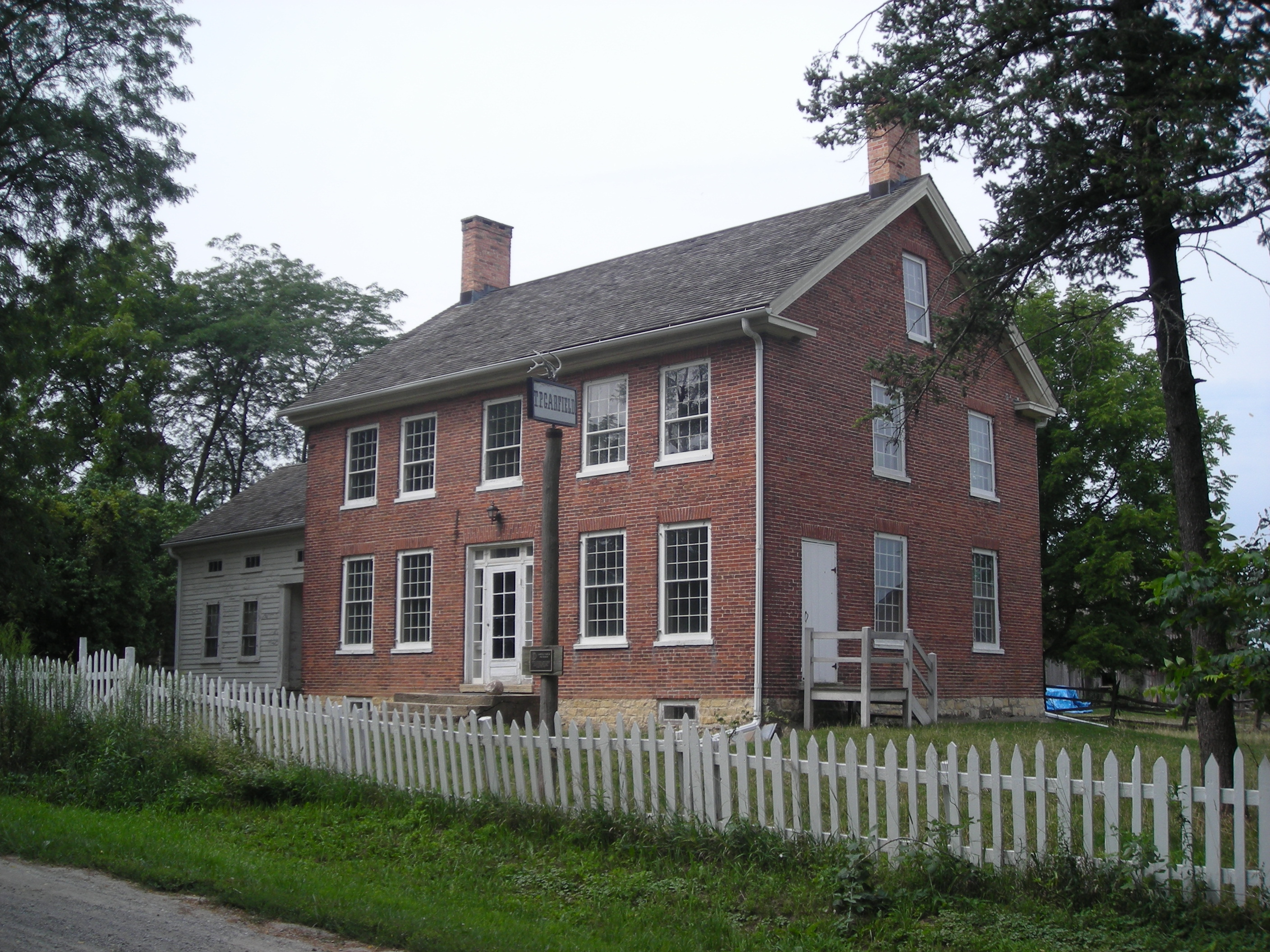
- Location: Campton Hills, Kane County, Illinois, United States
- Coordinates: 41°54′36″N 88°24′1″W
- Area: 237 acres (96 ha)
- Architect: Timothy P. Garfield
- NRHP reference No.: 78001156
- Added to NRHP: June 23, 1978

The Garfield Farm and Inn Museum is a Registered Historic Place in Kane County, Illinois, United States. The property is a 375-acre (1.52 km^{2}) farmstead, centered on an inn that served teamsters and the nearby community during the 1840s. It is currently a museum offering a variety of educational and entertainment events. The buildings that remain are three original 1840s structures, including the 1842 hay and grain barn, the 1849 horse barn, and the 1846 inn. Various other barns and outbuildings also stand, the last dated to 1906.

Garfield Farm & Tavern Museum is the only historically intact Illinois prairie farmstead and former teamsters' inn being restored by donors and volunteers from over 3500 households in 37 states as an 1840s living history farm and inn museum.

== History ==
Timothy Powers Garfield was a farmer, school teacher, brick maker and surveyor from Belmont, Vermont, who purchased Pennsylvanian settler Sam Culbertson's 440 acres (180 ha) 1835 claim west of the Fox River in 1841. He farmed wheat (the cash crop of the 1840s), corn, hay, oats, livestock, and dairy. He and his wife Harriet (Frost) remodeled Culbertson's log house into a log tavern or inn. In 1846, they built a brick house serving as their home and tavern to serve guests traveling between Chicago and the Rock River Valley. A westbound stagecoach and mail coach routinely passed the tavern at 4PM, and the tavern provided an overnight resting spot for travelers and teamsters driving wheat to the Chicago port. The Garfield family charged each traveler 37 and a half cents to stay the night. As many as 54 guests joined the family of 9 one night in the 5-room log tavern before moving into the brick inn several months later. The Garfield Inn also became a popular local meeting place, holding monthly dances on Saturdays on the second floor of the tavern. Live music was hired for these events, which attracted as many as 100 couples at once.

Coming of the railroad in December 1849 was the death knell for tavern keeping. The farm shifted from wheat to dairy operations by the 1860s. A granddaughter, Elva Ruth Garfield, donated 163 acres and farm buildings in 1977 to the founding 501(c)3 nonprofit organizations, Garfield Heritage Society, Inc. and Campton Historic Agricultural Lands, Inc. to become a museum. Artifacts, furnishings, and family letters and documents survive because Miss Garfield's mother, Hannah Mighell Garfield, first voiced her idea for a making the house a museum in the 1890s. The Garfield Farm and Tavern received recognition by the United States Department of the Interior as a Historic Place on June 23, 1978.

Garfield Heritage Society is responsible for the day-to-day interpretation of the site and Campton Historic Agricultural Lands owns the bulk of the property. Both groups are responsible for the preservation of the buildings, lands, and history. The two nonprofits depend exclusively on donations and are currently seeking $3 million to complete restoration of the 24 historic structures at Garfield Farm and the adjacent 2nd generation's 1859 Edward Garfield/Mongerson Brothers Farmstead the project acquired in 2002. It was added in January 2016 to the National Register by expanding the boundaries of the 1978 Register designation of Garfield Farm and Tavern.

== Architecture ==
Fourteen buildings form the Garfield Farm and Tavern on 237 acres (96 ha). It is bordered by Campton Hills Drive to the north and Illinois Route 38 to the south, accessed via Garfield Road in Campton Hills, IL. The Garfield Cemetery owned by the nonprofit Campton Cemetery Association also lies along Garfield Road, used by the community since 1846. The tavern and house building was built by T. P. Garfield in 1846. The house was a red-brick neoclassical with Federal Style details. The 2 1/2 -story structure has a center door with sidelights and 2-over-2 windows (originally 12 over 8). Inside, a center hall has two rooms to the left (a ladies' parlor and a bedroom, a barroom to the right with a (dining room) behind, and another(bedroom). The center hall on the second hall has a staircase leading to the third. The 3/4ths of this floor was used as an L-shaped ballroom with a front corner bedroom. The third floor had a bedroom on either side of the center hall and storage. The first floor parlor had stairs leading to the basement, which was 8 feet (2.4 m) deep. The tavern's frame annex is one and a half stories, measuring 20 by 28 feet (6.1 m × 8.5 m). It was used as a kitchen with a summer kitchen and storage room for firewood, grain, equipment, and laundry. An 8 by 14 feet (2.4 m × 4.3 m) recessed porch has half columns on its ends. The southeast wall had a brick chimney for use as a stove for the kitchen.

Four barns are standing on the grounds; the 1842 hay barn is 44 by 32 feet (13.4 m × 9.8 m), the 1849 horse barn is 28 by 52 feet (8.5 m × 15.8 m), the c. 1895 grain barn is 34 by 28.5 feet (10.4 m × 8.7 m), and the 1906 dairy barn is 34 by 84 feet (10 m × 26 m). A carriage house retains its historical integrity aside from a cement floor added in 1960s. A small chicken house (no longer extant)was built sometime after 1900, and a larger, six-sided chicken house (no longer extant)was built in the 1930s. The milk house (no longer extant) was built between 1915 and 1920 with cement blocks and four windows. The cement silo (1913) rises 50 feet (15 m) high with an 18 feet (5.5 m) diameter. After 1906, a wooden windmill was built to provide water for the farm and house, replaced in the late teens with a taller metal windmill tower. A cistern was built in the crawlspace under a western expansion in 1875 of the kitchen of the house. A 30 foot (9.1 m) deep dug water well provides groundwater, and an outhouse also stands on the property.

== Literature ==
Angie of Garfield Farm was printed in November 2014 and is a fictional children's chapter book using the names and basics facts about the farm. The story features 9-year-old Angeline Garfield in 1847. The author is Ann Brack Johnson, and it is illustrated by Pamela Hamilton.
