= Discovery-Spring Garden, Maryland =

- Former census-designated place (CDP)
- Coordinates: 39°27′50″N 77°21′38″W
- Country: United States
- State: Maryland
- County: Frederick

Area
  - Total: 0.97 sq mi (2.5 km^{2})
  - Land: 0.97 sq mi (2.5 km^{2})
  - Water: 0 sq mi (0.0 km^{2})

Population (2000)
  - Total: 2,152
  - Density: 2,259/sq mi (872.1/km^{2})
- Time zone: UTC−5 (Eastern (EST))
  - Summer (DST): UTC−4 (EDT)
- ZIP code: 21793
- Area codes: 301, 240
- FIPS code: 24-23005

Discovery-Spring Garden is a former census-designated place in Frederick County, Maryland, United States. It is the combination of the two unincorporated communities of Discovery and Spring Garden. As of the 2000 census, the population was 2,152; its population was not counted in 2010.

== Geography ==
Discovery-Spring Garden is located at 39°27′50″N 77°21′38″W (39.463960, −77.360581).

According to the United States Census Bureau, in 2000 the CDP had a total area of 0.9 square miles (2.3 km^{2}), all land.

== Demographics ==
As of the census of 2000, there were 2,152 people, 712 households, and 596 families residing in the CDP. The population density was 2,258.8 inhabitants per square mile (872.1/km^{2}). There were 731 housing units at an average density of 767.3 per square mile (296.3/km^{2}). The racial makeup of the CDP was 88.48% White, 7.53% African American, 0.05% Native American, 1.25% Asian, 0.09% Pacific Islander, 0.74% from other races, and 1.86% from two or more races. Hispanic or Latino of any race were 1.58% of the population.

There were 712 households, out of which 44.7% had children under the age of 18 living with them, 63.5% were married couples living together, 15.9% had a female householder with no husband present, and 16.2% were non-families. 12.6% of all households were made up of individuals, and 2.1% had someone living alone who was 65 years of age or older. The average household size was 3.02 and the average family size was 3.26.

In the CDP, the population was spread out, with 31.5% under the age of 18, 7.4% from 18 to 24, 30.3% from 25 to 44, 25.7% from 45 to 64, and 5.1% who were 65 years of age or older. The median age was 34 years. For every 100 females, there were 96.4 males. For every 100 females age 18 and over, there were 91.4 males.

The median income for a household in the CDP was $50,656, and the median income for a family was $52,000. Males had a median income of $37,500 versus $27,409 for females. The per capita income for the CDP was $18,704. About 1.5% of families and 2.9% of the population were below the poverty line, including 2.4% of those under age 18 and none of those age 65 or over.
