= Garfield Township, Phelps County, Nebraska =

Garfield Township
- Township
- Location in Phelps County
- Coordinates: 40°33′59″N 099°35′18″W
- Country: United States
- State: Nebraska
- County: Phelps

Area
  - Total: 35.91 sq mi (93.01 km^{2})
  - Land: 35.91 sq mi (93.01 km^{2})
  - Water: 0 sq mi (0 km^{2}) 0%
- Elevation: 2,451 ft (747 m)

Population (2000)
  - Total: 547
  - Density: 15/sq mi (5.9/km^{2})
- GNIS feature ID: 0838020

Garfield Township is one of fourteen townships in Phelps County, Nebraska, United States. The population was 547 at the 2000 census. A 2006 estimate placed the township's population at 556.

A portion of the Village of Bertand lies within the Township.
