= Garfield Township, Custer County, Nebraska =

Garfield Township
- Township
- Location in Custer County
- Coordinates: 41°30′31″N 099°31′41″W
- Country: United States
- State: Nebraska
- County: Custer

Area
  - Total: 65.94 sq mi (170.79 km^{2})
  - Land: 65.94 sq mi (170.79 km^{2})
  - Water: 0 sq mi (0 km^{2}) 0%
- Elevation: 2,530 ft (770 m)

Population (2020)
  - Total: 106
  - Density: 1.61/sq mi (0.621/km^{2})
- GNIS feature ID: 0838019

Garfield Township is one of thirty-one townships in Custer County, Nebraska, United States. The population was 106 at the 2020 census. A 2021 estimate placed the township's population at 105.

== See also ==
- County government in Nebraska
