= Garfield Township, Cuming County, Nebraska =

Garfield Township
- Township
- Location in Cuming County
- Coordinates: 41°52′32″N 096°36′19″W
- Country: United States
- State: Nebraska
- County: Cuming

Area
  - Total: 35.79 sq mi (92.69 km^{2})
  - Land: 35.79 sq mi (92.69 km^{2})
  - Water: 0 sq mi (0 km^{2}) 0%
- Elevation: 1,434 ft (437 m)

Population (2020)
  - Total: 190
  - Density: 5.3/sq mi (2.0/km^{2})
- GNIS feature ID: 0838018

Garfield Township is one of sixteen townships in Cuming County, Nebraska, United States. The population was 190 at the 2020 census. A 2021 estimate placed the township's population at 188.

== See also ==
- County government in Nebraska
