= Garfield Township, Lac qui Parle County, Minnesota =

Garfield Township, Minnesota
- Township
- Location within the state of Minnesota Garfield Township, Minnesota (the United States)
- Coordinates: 44°56′42″N 96°17′54″W
- Country: United States
- State: Minnesota
- County: Lac qui Parle

Area
  - Total: 37.2 sq mi (96.4 km^{2})
  - Land: 37.2 sq mi (96.3 km^{2})
  - Water: 0.039 sq mi (0.1 km^{2})
- Elevation: 1,089 ft (332 m)

Population (2000)
  - Total: 187
  - Density: 4.9/sq mi (1.9/km^{2})
- Time zone: UTC-6 (Central (CST))
  - Summer (DST): UTC-5 (CDT)
- FIPS code: 27-23138
- GNIS feature ID: 0664245

Garfield Township is a township in Lac qui Parle County, Minnesota, United States. The population was 187 at the 2000 census.

Garfield Township was organized in 1881, and named for James A. Garfield (1831–1881), the 20th President of the United States.

== Geography ==
According to the United States Census Bureau, the township has a total area of 37.2 square miles (96 km^{2}), of which 37.2 square miles (96 km^{2}) is land and 0.04 square miles (0.10 km^{2}) (0.11%) is water.

== Demographics ==
As of the census of 2000, there were 187 people, 65 households, and 52 families residing in the township. The population density was 5.0 inhabitants per square mile (1.9/km^{2}). There were 73 housing units at an average density of 2.0 per square mile (0.77/km^{2}). The racial makeup of the township was 100.00% White.

There were 65 households, out of which 35.4% had children under the age of 18 living with them, 76.9% were married couples living together, and 18.5% were non-families. 16.9% of all households were made up of individuals, and 7.7% had someone living alone who was 65 years of age or older. The average household size was 2.88 and the average family size was 3.23.

In the township the population was spread out, with 33.7% under the age of 18, 4.3% from 18 to 24, 26.2% from 25 to 44, 20.3% from 45 to 64, and 15.5% who were 65 years of age or older. The median age was 35 years. For every 100 females, there were 114.9 males. For every 100 females age 18 and over, there were 113.8 males.

The median income for a household in the township was $40,625, and the median income for a family was $45,625. Males had a median income of $26,875 versus $20,417 for females. The per capita income for the township was $25,220. About 4.1% of families and 5.4% of the population were below the poverty line, including 9.0% of those under the age of eighteen and none of those 65 or over.
