= Lincoln Township, Missouri =

Lincoln Township, Missouri may refer to one of the following 16 places in the State of Missouri:

- Lincoln Township, Andrew County, Missouri
- Lincoln Township, Atchison County, Missouri
- Lincoln Township, Caldwell County, Missouri
- Lincoln Township, Christian County, Missouri
- Lincoln Township, Clark County, Missouri
- Lincoln Township, Dallas County, Missouri
- Lincoln Township, Daviess County, Missouri
- Lincoln Township, Douglas County, Missouri
- Lincoln Township, Grundy County, Missouri
- Lincoln Township, Harrison County, Missouri
- Lincoln Township, Holt County, Missouri
- Lincoln Township, Jasper County, Missouri
- Lincoln Township, Lawrence County, Missouri
- Lincoln Township, Nodaway County, Missouri
- Lincoln Township, Putnam County, Missouri
- Lincoln Township, Stone County, Missouri

== See also ==
- Lincoln Township (disambiguation)
