= Lincoln Township =

Lincoln Township may refer to:

== Arkansas ==
- Lincoln Township, Madison County, Arkansas
- Lincoln Township, Newton County, Arkansas, in Newton County, Arkansas
- Lincoln Township, Washington County, Arkansas

== Illinois ==
- Lincoln Township, Illinois
- West Lincoln Township, Logan County, Illinois
- East Lincoln Township, Logan County, Illinois

== Indiana ==
- Lincoln Township, Hendricks County, Indiana
- Lincoln Township, LaPorte County, Indiana
- Lincoln Township, Newton County, Indiana
- Lincoln Township, St. Joseph County, Indiana
- Lincoln Township, White County, Indiana

== Iowa ==
- Lincoln Township, Adair County, Iowa
- Lincoln Township, Adams County, Iowa
- Lincoln Township, Appanoose County, Iowa
- Lincoln Township, Audubon County, Iowa
- Lincoln Township, Black Hawk County, Iowa
- Lincoln Township, Buena Vista County, Iowa
- Lincoln Township, Calhoun County, Iowa
- Lincoln Township, Cass County, Iowa
- Lincoln Township, Cerro Gordo County, Iowa
- Lincoln Township, Clay County, Iowa
- Lincoln Township, Dallas County, Iowa
- Lincoln Township, Emmet County, Iowa
- Lincoln Township, Grundy County, Iowa
- Lincoln Township, Hamilton County, Iowa
- Lincoln Township, Harrison County, Iowa
- Lincoln Township, Iowa County, Iowa
- Lincoln Township, Johnson County, Iowa
- Lincoln Township, Kossuth County, Iowa
- Lincoln Township, Lucas County, Iowa
- Lincoln Township, Madison County, Iowa, in Madison County, Iowa
- Lincoln Township, Mahaska County, Iowa
- Lincoln Township, Monona County, Iowa
- Lincoln Township, Montgomery County, Iowa
- Lincoln Township, O'Brien County, Iowa, in O'Brien County, Iowa
- Lincoln Township, Page County, Iowa
- Lincoln Township, Plymouth County, Iowa
- Lincoln Township, Pocahontas County, Iowa
- Lincoln Township, Polk County, Iowa
- Lincoln Township, Pottawattamie County, Iowa
- Lincoln Township, Poweshiek County, Iowa
- Lincoln Township, Ringgold County, Iowa
- Lincoln Township, Scott County, Iowa
- Lincoln Township, Shelby County, Iowa, in Shelby County, Iowa
- Lincoln Township, Sioux County, Iowa
- Lincoln Township, Story County, Iowa
- Lincoln Township, Tama County, Iowa
- Lincoln Township, Union County, Iowa, in Union County, Iowa
- Lincoln Township, Warren County, Iowa, in Warren County, Iowa
- Lincoln Township, Winnebago County, Iowa
- Lincoln Township, Winneshiek County, Iowa, in Winneshiek County, Iowa
- Lincoln Township, Worth County, Iowa
- Lincoln Township, Wright County, Iowa

== Kansas ==
- Lincoln Township, Anderson County, Kansas
- Lincoln Township, Butler County, Kansas
- Lincoln Township, Cloud County, Kansas
- Lincoln Township, Coffey County, Kansas
- Lincoln Township, Crawford County, Kansas
- Lincoln Township, Decatur County, Kansas
- Lincoln Township, Dickinson County, Kansas
- Lincoln Township, Edwards County, Kansas
- Lincoln Township, Ellsworth County, Kansas
- Lincoln Township, Franklin County, Kansas
- Lincoln Township, Grant County, Kansas
- Lincoln Township, Jackson County, Kansas
- Lincoln Township, Linn County, Kansas, in Linn County, Kansas
- Lincoln Township, Marshall County, Kansas, in Marshall County, Kansas
- Lincoln Township, Neosho County, Kansas
- Lincoln Township, Osage County, Kansas, in Osage County, Kansas
- Lincoln Township, Ottawa County, Kansas, in Ottawa County, Kansas
- Lincoln Township, Pawnee County, Kansas, in Pawnee County, Kansas
- Lincoln Township, Pottawatomie County, Kansas, in Pottawatomie County, Kansas
- Lincoln Township, Reno County, Kansas, in Reno County, Kansas
- Lincoln Township, Republic County, Kansas
- Lincoln Township, Rice County, Kansas
- Lincoln Township, Russell County, Kansas
- Lincoln Township, Sedgwick County, Kansas
- Lincoln Township, Sherman County, Kansas
- Lincoln Township, Smith County, Kansas, in Smith County, Kansas
- Lincoln Township, Stafford County, Kansas, in Stafford County, Kansas
- Lincoln Township, Washington County, Kansas, in Washington County, Kansas

== Michigan ==
- Lincoln Charter Township, Michigan, in Berrien County
- Lincoln Township, Arenac County, Michigan
- Lincoln Township, Clare County, Michigan
- Lincoln Township, Huron County, Michigan
- Lincoln Township, Isabella County, Michigan
- Lincoln Township, Midland County, Michigan
- Lincoln Township, Newaygo County, Michigan
- Lincoln Township, Osceola County, Michigan

== Minnesota ==
- Lincoln Township, Blue Earth County, Minnesota
- Lincoln Township, Marshall County, Minnesota

== Missouri ==
- Lincoln Township, Andrew County, Missouri
- Lincoln Township, Atchison County, Missouri
- Lincoln Township, Caldwell County, Missouri
- Lincoln Township, Christian County, Missouri
- Lincoln Township, Clark County, Missouri
- Lincoln Township, Dallas County, Missouri
- Lincoln Township, Daviess County, Missouri
- Lincoln Township, Douglas County, Missouri, in Douglas County, Missouri
- Lincoln Township, Grundy County, Missouri
- Lincoln Township, Harrison County, Missouri
- Lincoln Township, Holt County, Missouri
- Lincoln Township, Jasper County, Missouri
- Lincoln Township, Lawrence County, Missouri
- Lincoln Township, Nodaway County, Missouri
- Lincoln Township, Putnam County, Missouri
- Lincoln Township, Stone County, Missouri

== Nebraska ==
- Lincoln Township, Antelope County, Nebraska
- Lincoln Township, Cuming County, Nebraska
- Lincoln Township, Gage County, Nebraska
- Lincoln Township, Kearney County, Nebraska
- Lincoln Township, Knox County, Nebraska

== New Jersey ==
- Lincoln Township, New Jersey in Monmouth County

== North Dakota ==
- Lincoln Township, Emmons County, North Dakota
- Lincoln Township, Pembina County, North Dakota, in Pembina County, North Dakota

== Ohio ==
- Lincoln Township, Morrow County, Ohio

== Pennsylvania ==
- Lincoln Township, Bedford County, Pennsylvania
- Lincoln Township, Huntingdon County, Pennsylvania
- Lincoln Township, Somerset County, Pennsylvania

== South Dakota ==
- Lincoln Township, Brown County, South Dakota, in Brown County, South Dakota
- Lincoln Township, Clark County, South Dakota, in Clark County, South Dakota
- Lincoln Township, Douglas County, South Dakota, in Douglas County, South Dakota
- Lincoln Township, Lincoln County, South Dakota, in Lincoln County, South Dakota
- Lincoln Township, Perkins County, South Dakota
- Lincoln Township, Spink County, South Dakota, in Spink County, South Dakota
- Lincoln Township, Tripp County, South Dakota, in Tripp County, South Dakota
