= National Register of Historic Places listings in Antelope County, Nebraska =

Location of Antelope County in Nebraska

Antelope County, Nebraska, United States, has 11 properties listed on the National Register of Historic Places and one former listing.

The locations of National Register properties for which the latitude and longitude coordinates are included below may be seen on a map.

This National Park Service list is complete through NPS recent listings posted October 30, 2026.

== Current listings ==
	Name on the Register	Image	Date listed	Location	City or town	Description
1	Antelope County Courthouse	Antelope County Courthouse	December 3, 1980 (#80002438)	501-511 Main St. 42°07′48″N 98°01′44″W	Neligh	
2	Downtown Neligh Historic District		November 9, 2017 (#100001796)	Main St. from 5th to 2nd Sts. 42°07′43″N 98°01′48″W	Neligh	
3	Elkhorn River Bridge	Elkhorn River Bridge	June 29, 1992 (#92000771)	Township road over the Elkhorn River, 3 miles east of Clearwater; 42°09′36″N 98°07′33″W	Clearwater	
4	Gates College Gymnasium	Gates College Gymnasium	April 20, 1981 (#81000367)	509 L St. 42°07′49″N 98°01′40″W	Neligh	
5	Kester Planing Mill	Kester Planing Mill	July 28, 2014 (#14000463)	Southwest corner, 4th and O Streets; 42°07′42″N 98°01′58″W	Neligh	
6	Maybury-McPherson House	Maybury-McPherson House	March 14, 1996 (#96000280)	502 E. 4th St. 42°07′44″N 98°01′26″W	Neligh	
7	Neligh Carnegie Library	Neligh Carnegie Library	June 26, 2024 (#100010466)	510 M St. 42°07′49″N 98°01′48″W	Neligh	
8	Neligh Mill	Neligh Mill	October 15, 1969 (#69000128)	111 W. 2nd St.; also includes the mill elevators; also irregular tracts in Block 2 of the original Neligh survey and in the northern half of the southeastern quarter of Section 20, Township 25 North, Range 6 West; 42°07′35″N 98°01′50″W	Neligh	Mill elevators represent a boundary increase; irregular tracts represent a boundary increase of April 2, 2010
9	Neligh Mill Bridge	Neligh Mill Bridge	June 29, 1992 (#92000724)	Elm St. over the Elkhorn River; 42°07′32″N 98°01′51″W	Neligh	Bridge damaged by flooding in June 2010; Antelope County Board of Supervisors voted in April 2011 to remove it, but rescinded this decision in June 2011.
10	St. Peter's Episcopal Church	St. Peter's Episcopal Church	December 3, 1980 (#80002439)	411 L St. 42°07′46″N 98°01′42″W	Neligh	
11	Verdigris Creek Bridge	Verdigris Creek Bridge	June 29, 1992 (#92000770)	Township road over Verdigris Creek, 1.9 miles northeast of Royal; 42°21′31″N 98°06′23″W	Royal	

== Former listings ==
	Name on the Register	Image	Date listed	Date removed	Location	City or town	Description
1	Bridge	Bridge	June 29, 1992 (#92000725)	March 25, 2019	Township road over an unnamed stream, 6.8 miles northeast of Royal; 42°24′50″N 98°04′02″W	Royal	Bridge apparently gone: see photo. Site not listed on Nebraska State Historical Society's website.

== See also ==
- List of National Historic Landmarks in Nebraska
- National Register of Historic Places listings in Nebraska
