= Verdigris Township, Nebraska =

Verdigris Township, Nebraska may refer to the following places:

- Verdigris Township, Antelope County, Nebraska
- Verdigris Township, Holt County, Nebraska

See also

- Verdigris Township (disambiguation)
