= Lincoln Township, Minnesota =

Lincoln Township is the name of some places in the U.S. state of Minnesota:

- Lincoln Township, Blue Earth County, Minnesota
- Lincoln Township, Marshall County, Minnesota

== See also ==
- Lincoln Township (disambiguation)
