= Nebraska State Historical Society =

Independent state agency and membership organization in Nebraska, United States

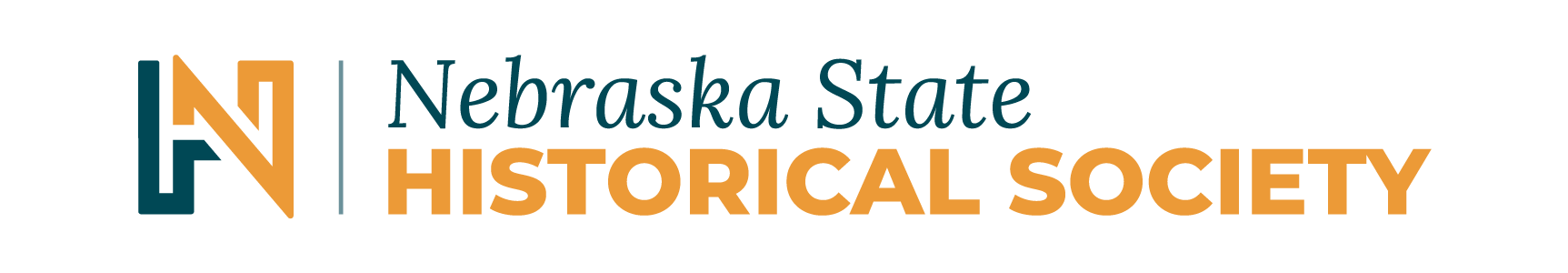
- Logo since 2024

Agency overview
- Formed: 1878
- Preceding agencies: Nebraska State Historical Society; History Nebraska
- Jurisdiction: State of Nebraska
- Headquarters: 1500 R Street, Lincoln, Nebraska
- Agency executive: Daryl Bohac, Director
- Website: Nebraska State Historical Society (Official Site)

Nebraska State Historical Society, formerly History Nebraska, is a Nebraska state agency, founded in 1878 to "encourage historical research and inquiry, spread historical information ... and to embrace alike aboriginal and modern history." It was designated a state institution in 1883, and upgraded to a state agency in 1994. The agency rebranded and announced their name change to History Nebraska on April 30, 2018. The agency returned to its original name of the Nebraska State Historical Society on September 3, 2024.

The agency's mission statement is "[to] collect, preserve, and open to all, the histories we share." The agency developed a process for the return of human remains, burial objects and cultural items of 1,400 individuals in accordance with the Native American Graves Protection and Repatriation Act of 1990.

== State Historic Sites ==
Facilities and operations of the society include:

Site name	Image	Nearest city	County	Remarks
Chimney Rock		Bayard	Morrill	The formation served as a landmark along the Oregon Trail, the California Trail, and the Mormon Trail during the mid-19th century. The trails ran along the north side of the rock, which remains a visible landmark for modern travelers along U.S. Route 26 and Nebraska Highway 92.
Fort Robinson		Crawford	Dawes and Sioux	Former U.S. Army fort in the Pine Ridge region of northwest Nebraska. Fort Robinson played a major role in the Sioux Wars from 1876 to 1890. The Battle of Warbonnet Creek took place nearby in July 1876. Crazy Horse surrendered here with his band on May 6, 1877.
John G. Neihardt State Historic Site		Bancroft	Cuming	Features museum exhibits about Nebraska Poet Laureate John Neihardt. The one-room study that Neihardt used from 1911 through 1920 as the place where he wrote many of his works is preserved at the site, and also features the Sacred Hoop Prayer Garden, designed by Neihardt, and a library with materials about Neihardt's life and legacy.
Museum of Nebraska History		Lincoln	Lancaster	The Society's headquarters features a library and archives, and administration and the research and publications operations of the Society. Located on the campus of University of Nebraska–Lincoln.
Neligh Mill State Historic Site		Neligh	Antelope	Museum commemorating the importance of flour mills to Nebraska and the West as a whole. Exhibits relating to the operation of the mill and its history are located in the original warehouse from 1866, as well as the 1915 addition where the power plant was once housed. The Society has restored the mill's office building, which has original furnishings. It reconstructed the 1919 flume to the south. The remnants of the dam that collected water for the mill are still visible on the Elkhorn River nearby.
Senator George Norris State Historic Site		McCook	Red Willow	Home of U.S. Senator George W. Norris (1862–1944), a Nebraska politician who championed the New Deal of the 1930s and the Rural Electrification Act.
Thomas P. Kennard House		Lincoln	Lancaster	Built in 1869, the Italianate house belonged to Thomas P. Kennard, the first Secretary of State for Nebraska, and one of three men who picked the Lincoln site for the new state's capital in 1867.

Nebraska State Historical Society also operates the Gerald R. Ford Conservation Center in Omaha.

== See also ==
- National Register of Historic Places listings in Nebraska
- List of National Historic Landmarks in Nebraska
- Nebraska Game and Parks Commission, manages several Nebraska State Historical Sites and Parks
