= Neligh News & Leader =

Newspaper in Nebraska, USA

Neligh News and Leader
- Type: Weekly newspaper
- Format: Broadsheet
- Owner: Pitzer Digital LLC
- Publisher: Carrie Pitzer
- Editor: Jenny Higgins
- Founded: 1879
- Headquarters: 314 Main Street, Neligh, NE 68756 United States
- Circulation: 1,535
- Website: antelopecountynews.com

The Neligh News and Leader, owned by Pitzer Digital LLC, is a weekly newspaper published in Neligh, Nebraska, serving as the county-seat newspaper for Antelope County, Nebraska. The News & Leader was established in 1879.

Antelope County News has a circulation of more than 2,500 print subscribers. Pitzer Digital also owns the Antelope County News, Knox County News, Creighton News and the Clearwater Record-Ewing News, and publishes several other area weeklies at their printing plant in Neligh.

== History ==
The Neligh Journal was published in 1875, and in 1879, The Republican appeared. The Neligh Leader, established in 1885, was edited by three generations of the Best family. Purchased by Loren Fry, who served as the Nebraska Press Association Board president in 1963, it celebrated 100 years of continuous publication. The Neligh News, established in 1915, was also purchased by Fry.

Sid and Sharon Charf purchased the Neligh News and Leader publication from Fry in 1983. In 2003, Dave and Joan Wright of Neligh acquired the business, which operates at 419 Main Street in Neligh. In 2019, Carrie and Wade Pitzer purchased the newspaper and moved operations to 314 M Street in Neligh.

Editions of Neligh News newspapers from 1879 to 2013 were compiled in a digital database available at the Neligh Public Library in 2015.

Neligh News and Leader often collaborates with Nebraska daily newspapers including the Omaha World Herald, Lincoln Journal Star, Kearney Hub and Norfolk Daily News. Neligh News and Leader articles have been reprinted in the above-mentioned publications, with permission, and Neligh News and Leader has also been attributed as a viable news source in articles.
