= Lincoln Township, Nebraska =

Lincoln Township, Nebraska may refer to the following places:

- Lincoln Township, Antelope County, Nebraska
- Lincoln Township, Cuming County, Nebraska
- Lincoln Township, Gage County, Nebraska
- Lincoln Township, Kearney County, Nebraska
- Lincoln Township, Knox County, Nebraska

== See also ==
- Lincoln Township (disambiguation)
