= Verdigris Township =

Verdigris Township may refer to the following places in the United States:

- Verdigris Township, Kansas
- Verdigris Township, Antelope County, Nebraska
- Verdigris Township, Holt County, Nebraska
- Verdigris Township, Rogers County, Oklahoma

See also

- Verdigris (disambiguation)
