= Clearwater Township =

Clearwater Township may refer to the following places in the United States:

- Clearwater Township, Michigan
- Clearwater Township, Minnesota
- Clearwater Township, Nebraska
