= Cedar Township, Nebraska =

Cedar Township, Nebraska may refer to the following places in Nebraska:

- Cedar Township, Antelope County, Nebraska
- Cedar Township, Buffalo County, Nebraska
- Cedar Township, Nance County, Nebraska

== See also ==
- Cedar Township (disambiguation)
