= Lincoln Township, Pennsylvania =

Lincoln Township is the name of some places in the U.S. state of Pennsylvania:

- Lincoln Township, Bedford County, Pennsylvania
- Lincoln Township, Huntingdon County, Pennsylvania
- Lincoln Township, Somerset County, Pennsylvania

== See also ==
- Lincoln, Pennsylvania (disambiguation)
- Lincoln Township (disambiguation)
