= Neligh Township, Nebraska =

Neligh Township, Nebraska may refer to the following places:

- Neligh Township, Antelope County, Nebraska
- Neligh Township, Cuming County, Nebraska
