= Antelope County Courthouse =

- U.S. National Register of Historic Places
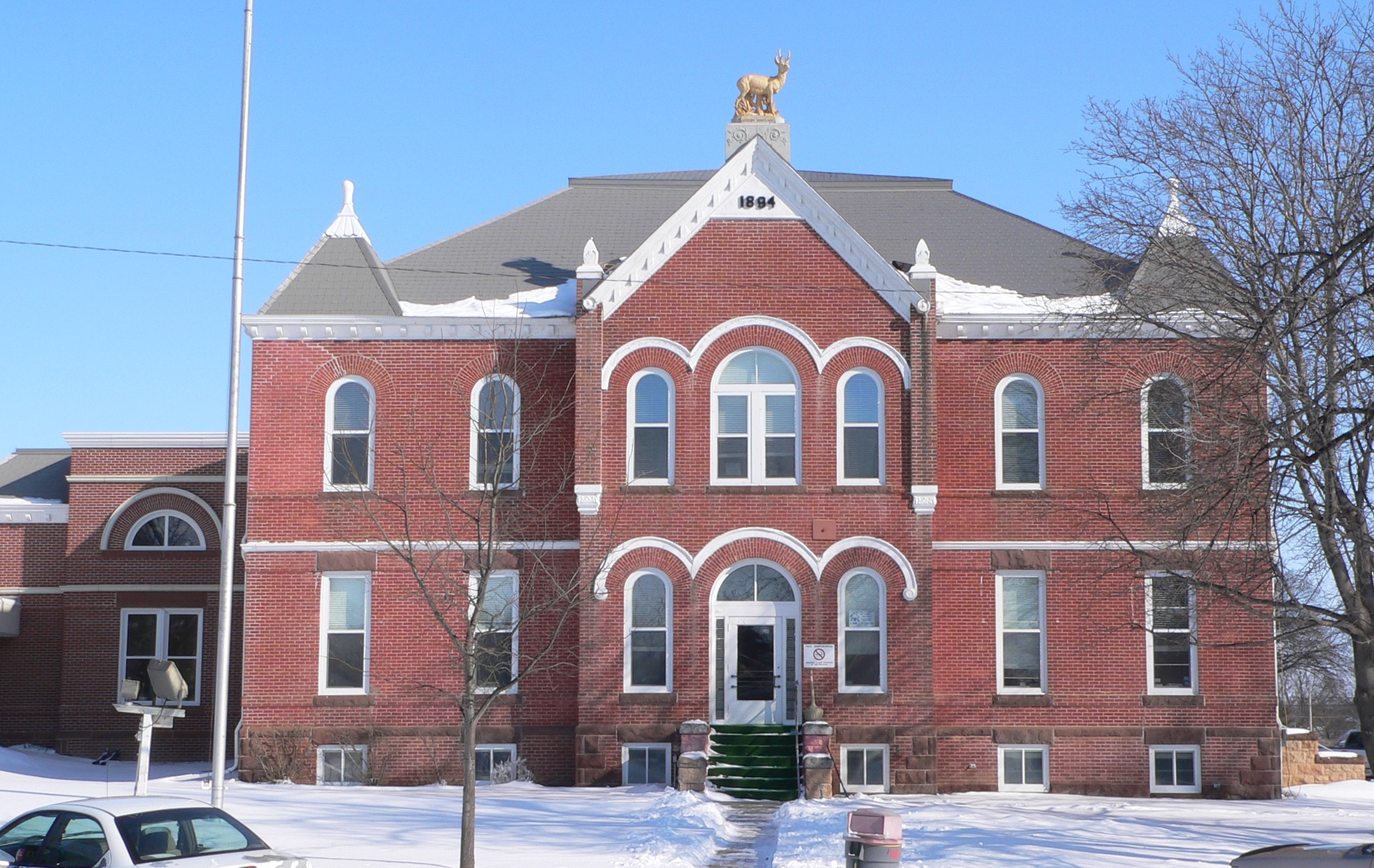
- Courthouse in 2010

- Location within Nebraska Location within the United States
- Location: 501-511 Main St., Neligh, Nebraska
- Coordinates: 42.13°N 98.028889°W
- Area: less than one acre
- Built: 1894-95
- Architect: MacDonald, George F.; Thornton, Fred
- NRHP reference No.: 80002438
- Added to NRHP: December 3, 1980

The Antelope County Courthouse, in Neligh in Antelope County, Nebraska, was built in 1894. It was listed on the National Register of Historic Places in 1980. As of 1980, it was one of the oldest courthouses still in use in Nebraska.

Neligh, founded in 1873, eventually won out over Oakdale, Nebraska as county seat, and county offices were moved to rented buildings in Neligh in 1883. The building was designed by George E. MacDonald of Lincoln, Nebraska, but the plans were found to be incomplete, and Fred Thornton of Neligh completed the drawings. Construction by contractor J. N. Mills started on August 2, 1894, and was completed January 11, 1985.

The building is 63 by 68 feet (19 m × 21 m) in plan. It originally had a large clock tower rising to 100 feet (30 m) in its center, surrounded by four pyramids at each corner. The tower was supported by arched trusses. The tower was removed in 1964, while the pyramids remain. County clerk, treasurer, and other county offices were moved to a separate annex building built in 1966, while the courthouse remained in the original building.

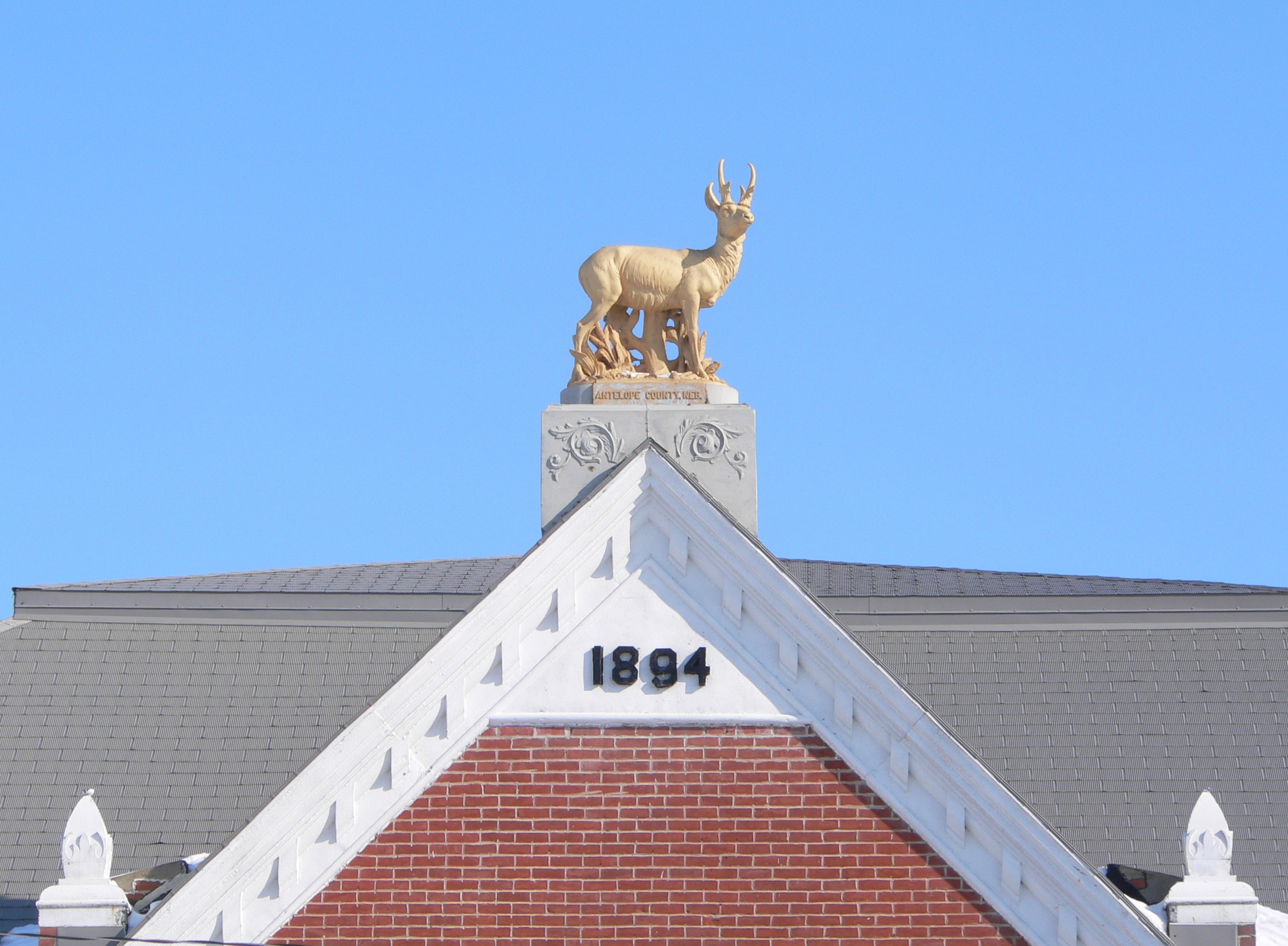

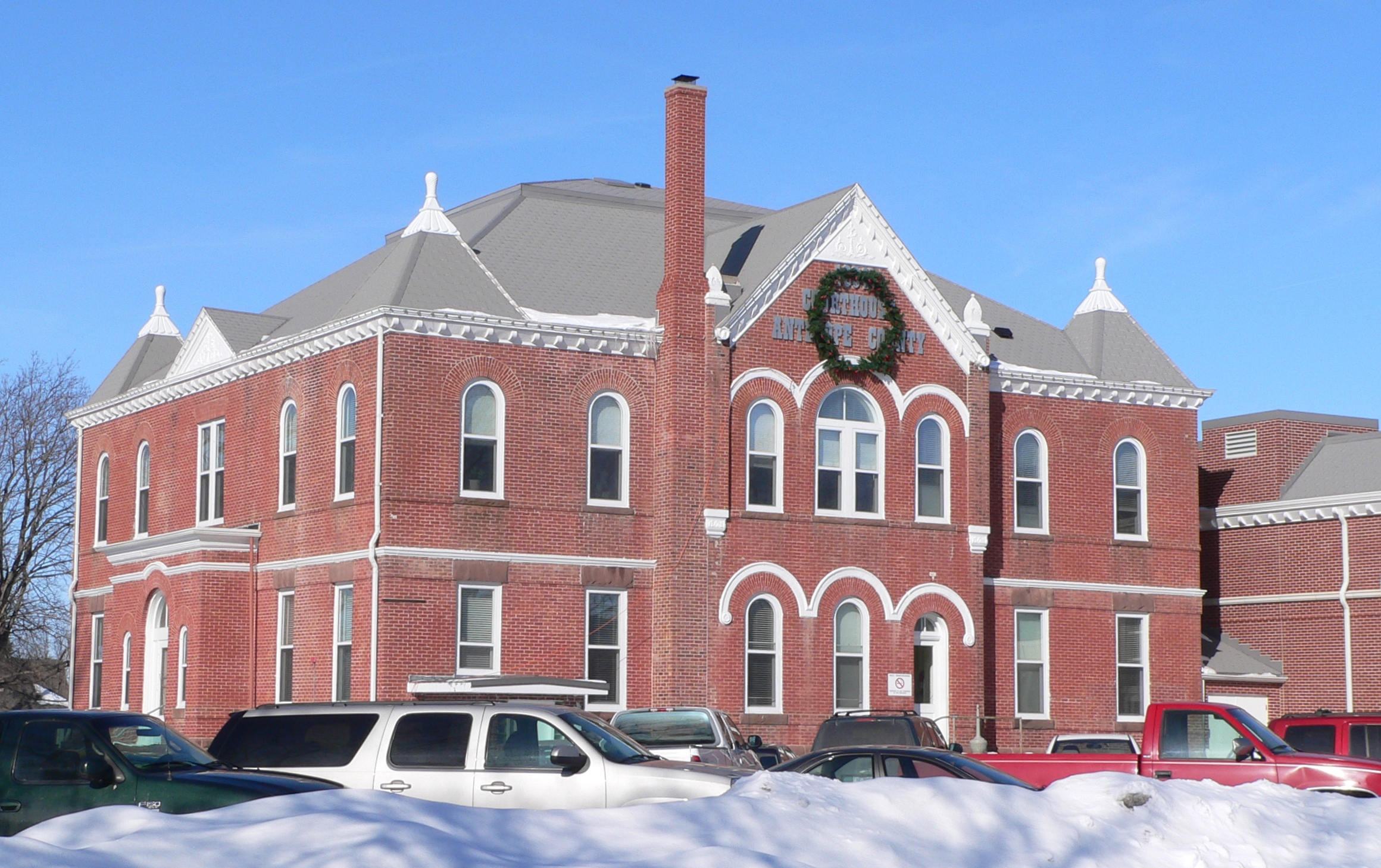
