= Verdigris (disambiguation) =

Verdigris is a common term for copper(II) acetate, the green patina that forms on copper, brass and bronze, and which is used as a pigment.

Verdigris may also refer to:

- Verdigris, Oklahoma
- Verdigris (Doctor Who), a Doctor Who novel
- Verdigris, a play by Jim Beaver
- Verdigris agaric, common name for the fungus Stropharia aeruginosa

== See also ==
- Verdigris Township, Antelope County, Nebraska
- Verdigris Township, Holt County, Nebraska
- Verdigris River, in Oklahoma and Kansas
