= Maybury–McPherson House =

Historic house in Nebraska, United States

- U.S. National Register of Historic Places
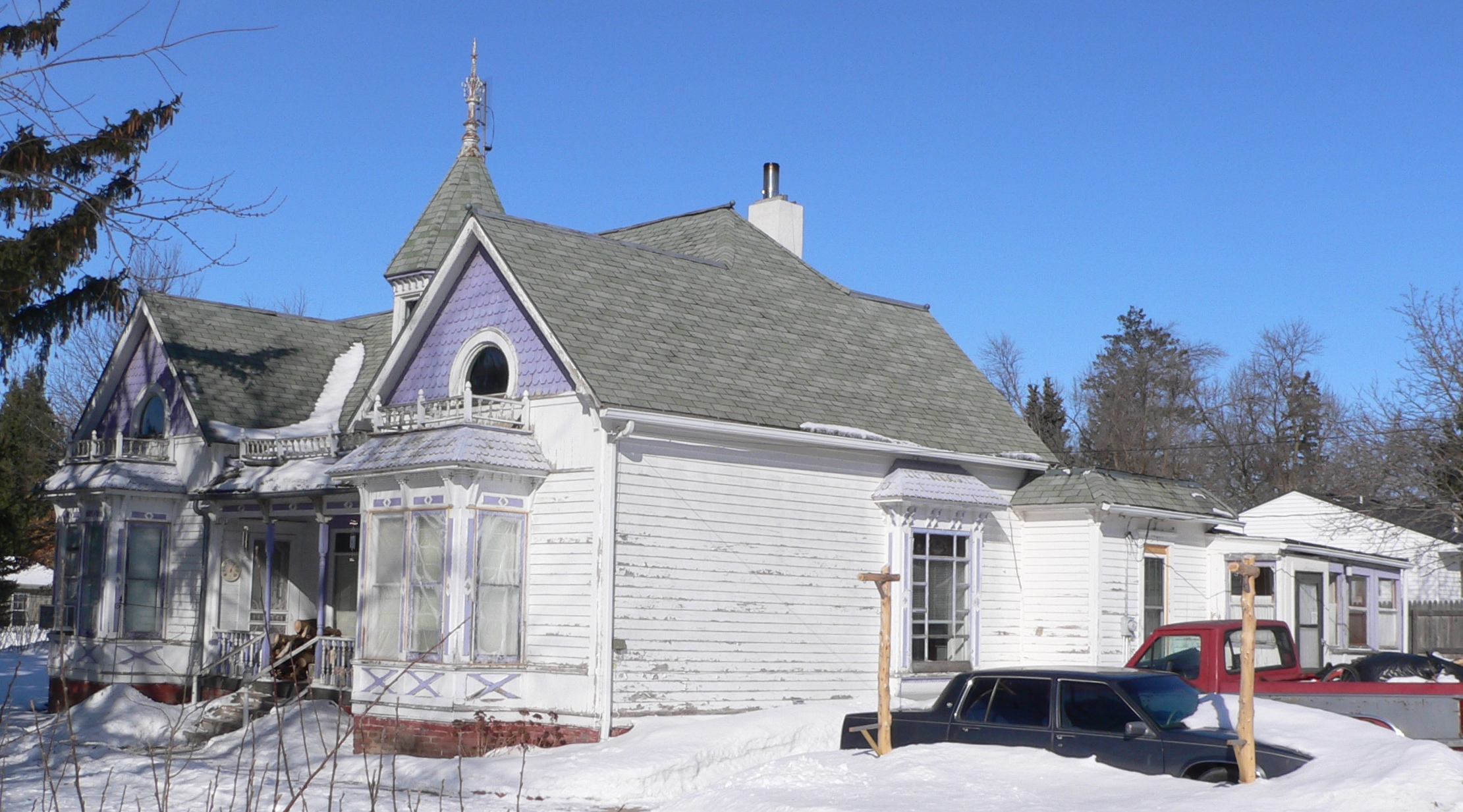

- Location within Nebraska Location within the United States
- Location: 502 E. Fourth St., Neligh, Nebraska
- Coordinates: 42°7′44″N 98°1′26″W
- Area: less than one acre
- Built: 1887
- Architectural style: Queen Anne
- NRHP reference No.: 96000280
- Added to NRHP: March 14, 1996

The Maybury–McPherson House, located at 502 E. 4th St. in Neligh in Antelope County, Nebraska, was built in 1887. It was listed on the National Register of Historic Places in 1996.

It is a one-and-a-half-story wood-frame building which faces south. It has a U-shaped 63 by 57 feet (19 m × 17 m) plan. The listing includes a 21 by 30 feet (6.4 m × 9.1 m) frame garage.
