= Sherman Township, Nebraska =

Sherman Township, Nebraska may refer to the following places:

- Sherman Township, Antelope County, Nebraska
- Sherman Township, Cuming County, Nebraska
- Sherman Township, Gage County, Nebraska
- Sherman Township, Kearney County, Nebraska
- Sherman Township, Platte County, Nebraska

See also

- Sherman Township (disambiguation)
