= Kester Planing Mill =

- U.S. National Register of Historic Places
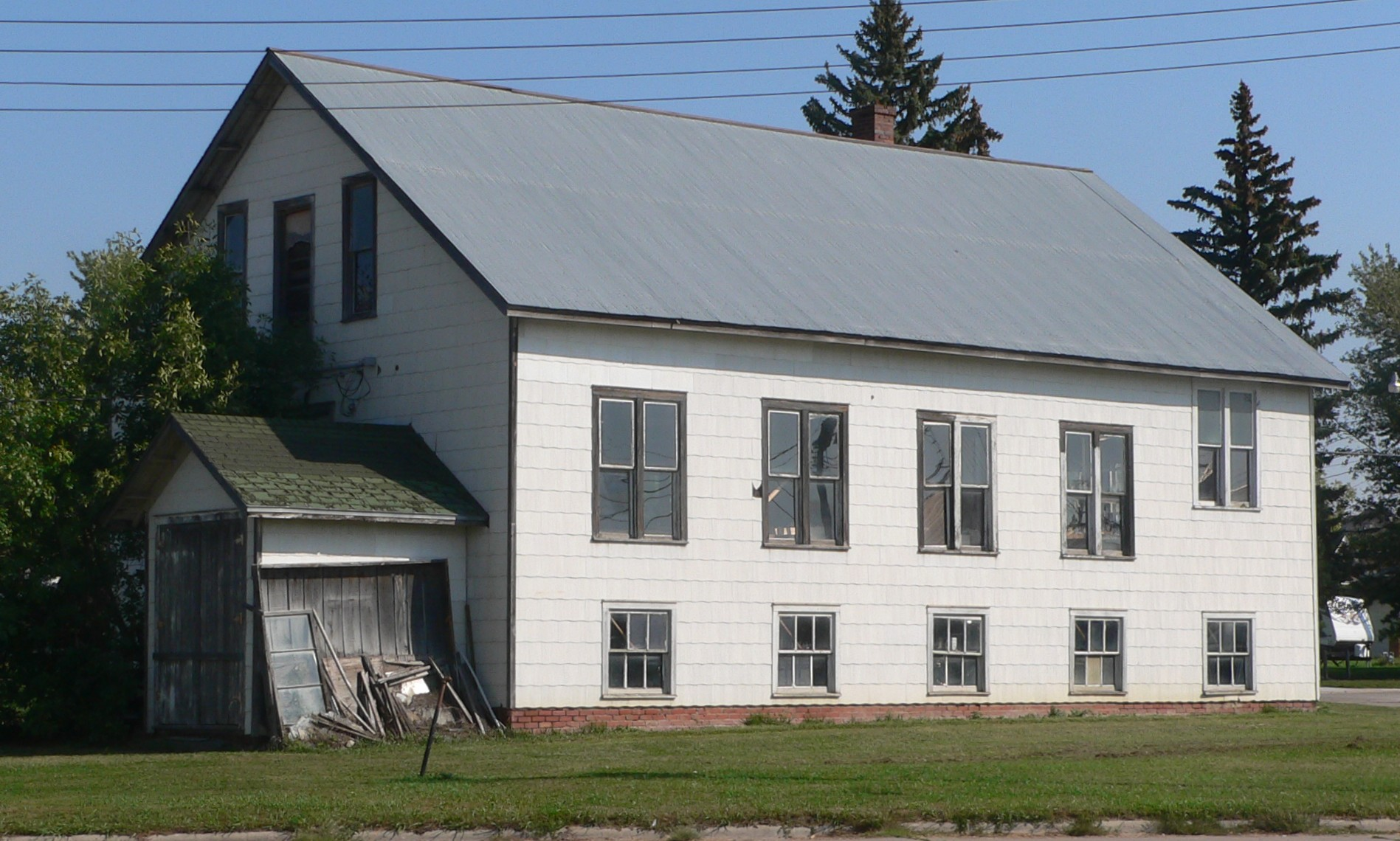

- Location within Nebraska Location within the United States
- Location: Southwest corner of 4th and O Streets in Neligh, Nebraska
- Coordinates: 42.1285°N 98.0329°W
- Area: less than one acre
- Built: 1911-12
- NRHP reference No.: 14000463
- Added to NRHP: July 28, 2014

The Kester Planing Mill, located at the southwest corner of 4th and O Streets in Neligh, in Antelope County, Nebraska, was built in 1911–12. Also known as the Neligh Planing Mill, it was listed on the National Register of Historic Places in 2014.

The planing mill was operated by four generations of the Kester family, until 2002.
