= Oakdale Township, Antelope County, Nebraska =

Oakdale Township
- Township
- Location in Antelope County
- Coordinates: 42°02′44″N 098°00′00″W
- Country: United States
- State: Nebraska
- County: Antelope

Area
  - Total: 35.68 sq mi (92.40 km^{2})
  - Land: 35.50 sq mi (91.94 km^{2})
  - Water: 0.18 sq mi (0.46 km^{2}) 0.49%
- Elevation: 1,785 ft (544 m)

Population (2010)
  - Total: 407
  - Density: 11/sq mi (4.4/km^{2})
- GNIS feature ID: 0838168

Oakdale Township is one of twenty-four townships in Antelope County, Nebraska, United States. The population was estimated to be 414 according to the US Census Bureau.

The village of Oakdale lies within the township.

== See also ==
- County government in Nebraska
