= Ellsworth Township, Antelope County, Nebraska =

Ellsworth Township
- Township
- Location in Antelope County
- Coordinates: 42°18′49″N 098°00′20″W
- Country: United States
- State: Nebraska
- County: Antelope

Area
  - Total: 35.80 sq mi (92.73 km^{2})
  - Land: 35.80 sq mi (92.73 km^{2})
  - Water: 0 sq mi (0 km^{2}) 0%
- Elevation: 1,906 ft (581 m)

Population (2010)
  - Total: 249
  - Density: 7.0/sq mi (2.7/km^{2})
- GNIS feature ID: 0837985

Ellsworth Township is one of twenty-four townships in Antelope County, Nebraska, United States. The population was 249 at the 2010 census.

The village of Brunswick lies within the township.

== See also ==
- County government in Nebraska
