= Lincoln, Pennsylvania (disambiguation) =

Lincoln, Pennsylvania is a borough in Allegheny County.

Lincoln, Pennsylvania could also refer to:

- Lincoln Township, Pennsylvania (disambiguation), various places
- Lincoln University (Pennsylvania)
- Lincoln University, Pennsylvania

== See also ==
- Lincoln Township (disambiguation), for the place names outside of Pennsylvania
