= Burnett Township, Antelope County, Nebraska =

Burnett Township, Nebraska
- Township
- Location in Antelope County
- Coordinates: 42°03′22″N 097°53′18″W
- Country: United States
- State: Nebraska
- County: Antelope

Area
  - Total: 35.44 sq mi (91.80 km^{2})
  - Land: 35.08 sq mi (90.85 km^{2})
  - Water: 0.37 sq mi (0.95 km^{2}) 1.03%
- Elevation: 1,690 ft (515 m)

Population (2010)
  - Total: 175
  - Density: 4.9/sq mi (1.9/km^{2})
- GNIS feature ID: 0837897

Burnett Township is one of twenty-four townships in Antelope County, Nebraska. The population was 175 at the 2010 census. It was named for a railroad official.

== See also ==
- County government in Nebraska
