= Lincoln Township, Washington County, Arkansas =

Township of Lincoln
- Township
- Location of Lincoln Township in Washington County

- Location of Washington County in Arkansas
- Coordinates: 35°56′58″N 94°25′5″W
- Country: United States
- State: Arkansas
- County: Washington

Area
  - Total: 1.8 sq mi (4.7 km^{2})
  - Land: 1.8 sq mi (4.7 km^{2})
  - Water: 0.0 sq mi (0 km^{2}) 0%
- Elevation: 1,453 ft (443 m)

Population (2000)
  - Total: 1,752
  - Density: 983/sq mi (380/km^{2})
- Time zone: UTC-6 (CST)
  - Summer (DST): UTC-5 (CDT)
- Area code: 479
- GNIS feature ID: 2406956

Lincoln Township is one of thirty-seven townships in Washington County, Arkansas, USA. As of the 2000 census, its total population was 1,752.

== Geography ==
According to the United States Census Bureau, Lincoln Township covers an area of 1.8 square miles (4.7 km^{2}); all land. Lincoln Township is almost entirely engulfed by Starr Hill Township, with a very brief portion adjacent to Cane Hill Township.

=== Cities, towns, villages ===
- Lincoln

=== Cemeteries ===
The township contains Bean Cemetery, one of the National Register of Historic Places listings in Washington County, Arkansas.

=== Major routes ===
- U.S. Route 62
