= Willow Township, Antelope County, Nebraska =

Willow Township
- Township
- Location in Antelope County
- Coordinates: 42°13′07″N 097°53′01″W
- Country: United States
- State: Nebraska
- County: Antelope

Area
  - Total: 35.71 sq mi (92.48 km^{2})
  - Land: 35.71 sq mi (92.48 km^{2})
  - Water: 0 sq mi (0 km^{2}) 0%
- Elevation: 1,755 ft (535 m)

Population (2010)
  - Total: 50
  - Density: 1.3/sq mi (0.5/km^{2})
- GNIS feature ID: 0838332

Willow Township is one of twenty-four townships in Antelope County, Nebraska, United States. The population was 50 at the 2010 census.

== See also ==
- County government in Nebraska
