= Eden Township, Antelope County, Nebraska =

Eden Township
- Township
- Location in Antelope County
- Coordinates: 42°23′10″N 098°00′20″W
- Country: United States
- State: Nebraska
- County: Antelope

Area
  - Total: 36.09 sq mi (93.47 km^{2})
  - Land: 36.05 sq mi (93.36 km^{2})
  - Water: 0.042 sq mi (0.11 km^{2}) 0.12%
- Elevation: 1,811 ft (552 m)

Population (2010)
  - Total: 121
  - Density: 3.4/sq mi (1.3/km^{2})
- GNIS feature ID: 0837975

Eden Township is one of twenty-four townships in Antelope County, Nebraska, United States. The population was 121 at the 2010 census.

== See also ==
- County government in Nebraska
