= Elgin Township, Antelope County, Nebraska =

Elgin Township
- Township
- Location in Antelope County
- Coordinates: 42°03′09″N 098°06′49″W
- Country: United States
- State: Nebraska
- County: Antelope

Area
  - Total: 35.81 sq mi (92.75 km^{2})
  - Land: 35.81 sq mi (92.74 km^{2})
  - Water: 0.0039 sq mi (0.01 km^{2}) 0.01%
- Elevation: 1,949 ft (594 m)

Population (2010)
  - Total: 89
  - Density: 2.6/sq mi (1/km^{2})
- GNIS feature ID: 0837979

Elgin Township is one of twenty-four townships in Antelope County, Nebraska, United States. The population was 89 at the 2010 census.

== See also ==
- County government in Nebraska
