= John G. Neihardt State Historic Site =

- John G. Neihardt Study
- U.S. National Register of Historic Places
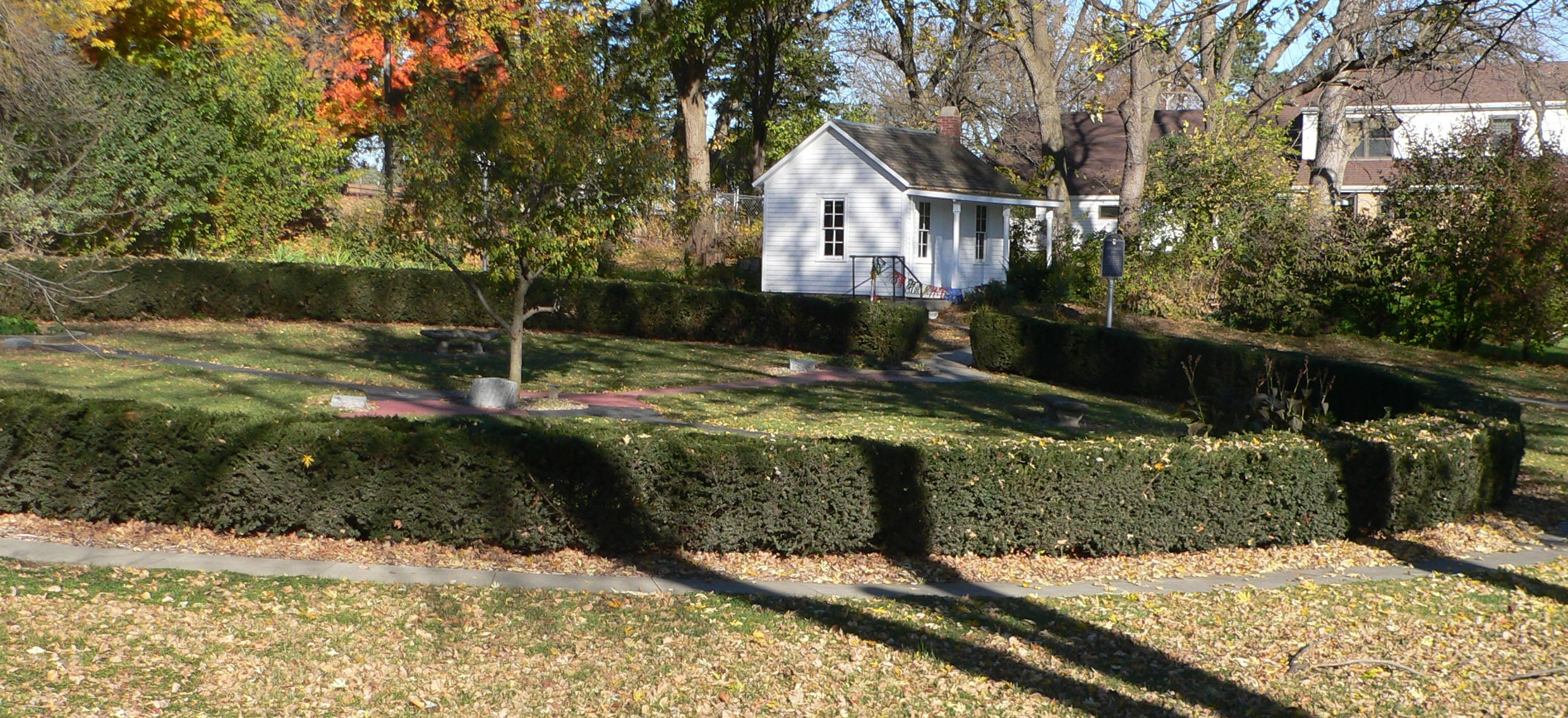
- The Neihardt Study and Sioux Prayer Garden

- Location within Nebraska Location within the United States
- Location: NW corner of Washington and Grove Sts., Bancroft, Nebraska
- Coordinates: 42.011233°N 96.577473°W
- Area: 0.5 acres (0.20 ha)
- Built: c.1890
- NRHP reference No.: 70000369
- Added to NRHP: July 28, 1970

The John G. Neihardt State Historic Site, also known as the Neihardt Center, is located in Bancroft, Nebraska, United States and features museum exhibits about Nebraska Poet Laureate John Neihardt.

The one-room study that Neihardt used from 1911 through 1920 as the place where he wrote many of his works is preserved at the site. In 1970 the site was entered into the National Register of Historic Places, and is the only structure remaining from the original property. The room has been furnished as if used by Neihardt, and visitors may view it from the open door.

The site is operated by the Nebraska State Historical Society and the John G. Neihardt Foundation, and also features the Sacred Hoop Prayer Garden, designed by Neihardt, and a library with materials about Neihardt's life and legacy. Special events include an annual Neihardt Day celebration.

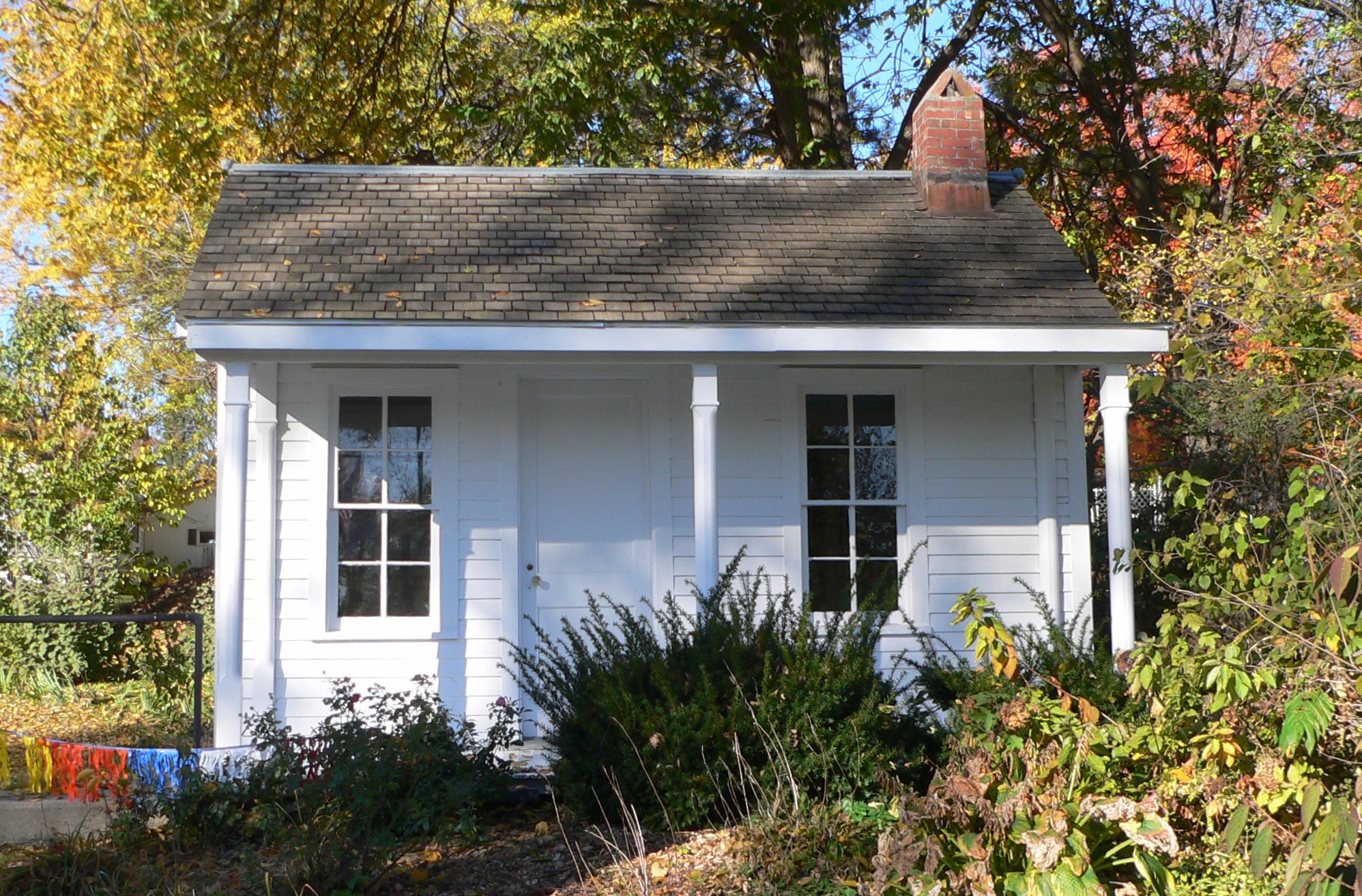

The study was built in the early 1890s by August Hartman as a small house for use by his daughter and husband. It came into ownership of the Canarsky family c.1900. John G. Neihardt purchased a house nearby, close to his mother's house. He rented the study from about 1911 to 1921 from the Canarsky family for use as his office and library. Neihard's house was later moved to a farm approximately 8 miles (13 km) east of Bancroft. In 1964 the study was purchased by the Bancroft Commercial Club from William Canarsky for $750, and it was restored in 1967 by the John G. Neihardt Foundation.
