= Neligh Township, Antelope County, Nebraska =

Neligh Township
- Township
- Location in Antelope County
- Coordinates: 42°07′58″N 098°00′32″W
- Country: United States
- State: Nebraska
- County: Antelope

Area
  - Total: 34.76 sq mi (90.04 km^{2})
  - Land: 34.59 sq mi (89.60 km^{2})
  - Water: 0.17 sq mi (0.43 km^{2}) 0.48%
- Elevation: 1,749 ft (533 m)

Population (2010)
  - Total: 271
  - Density: 7.8/sq mi (3/km^{2})
- GNIS feature ID: 0838152

Neligh Township is one of twenty-four townships in Antelope County, Nebraska, United States. The population was 271 at the 2010 census.

The city of Neligh is surrounded by the township.

== See also ==
- County government in Nebraska
