= Custer Township, Antelope County, Nebraska =

Custer Township
- Township
- Location in Antelope County
- Coordinates: 42°12′45″N 098°00′20″W
- Country: United States
- State: Nebraska
- County: Antelope

Area
  - Total: 35.85 sq mi (92.85 km^{2})
  - Land: 35.85 sq mi (92.85 km^{2})
  - Water: 0 sq mi (0 km^{2}) 0%
- Elevation: 1,896 ft (578 m)

Population (2010)
  - Total: 78
  - Density: 2.1/sq mi (0.8/km^{2})
- GNIS feature ID: 0837953

Custer Township is one of twenty-four townships in Antelope County, Nebraska, United States. The population was 78 at the 2010 census.

== See also ==
- County government in Nebraska
