= Gates College Gymnasium =

- U.S. National Register of Historic Places
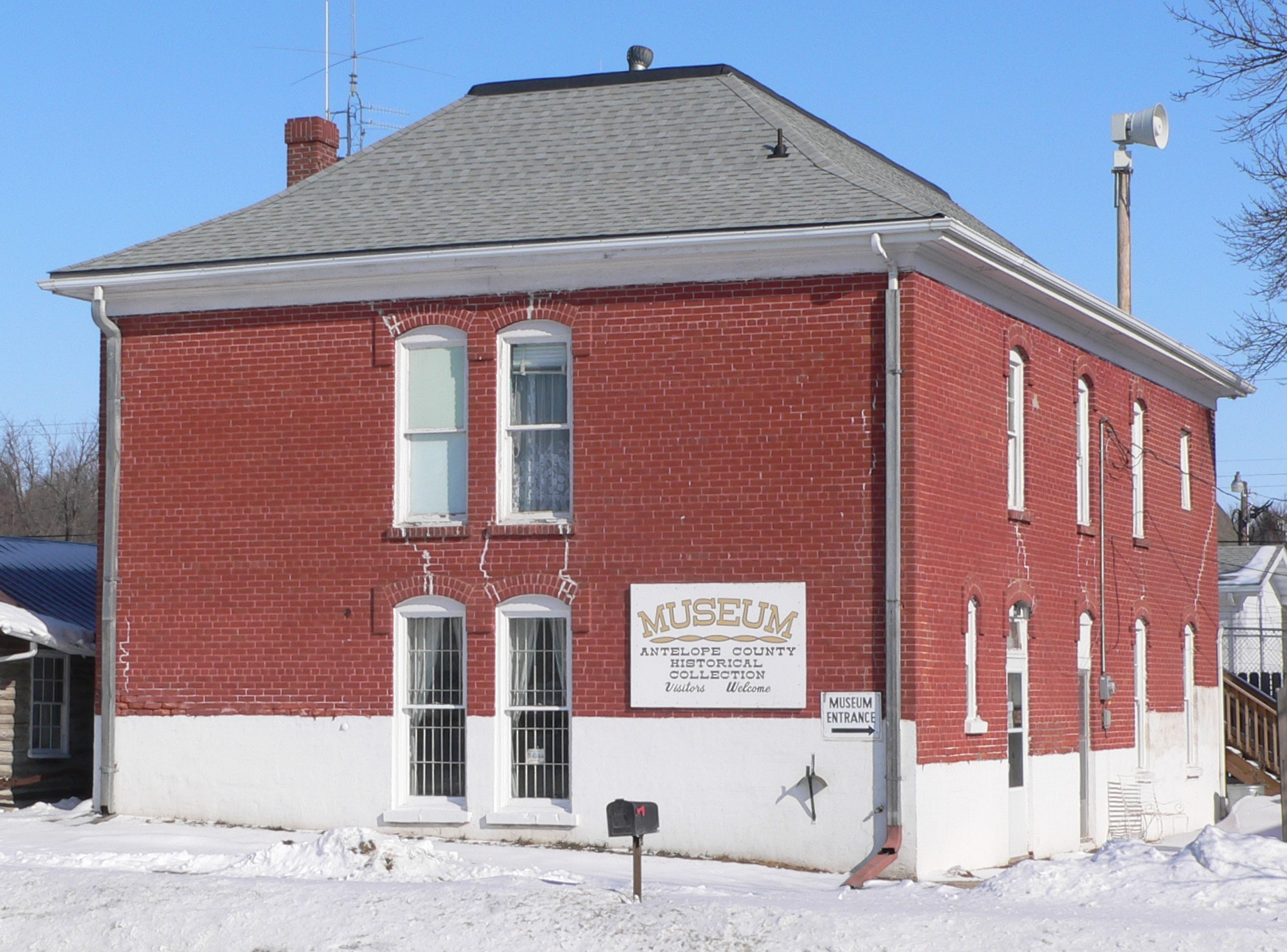

- Location within Nebraska Location within the United States
- Location: 509 L St., Neligh, Nebraska
- Coordinates: 42°7′49″N 98°1′40″W
- Built: 1892
- Built by: Brenton, T.H.; Spaulding, C.E.
- NRHP reference No.: 81000367
- Added to NRHP: April 20, 1981

The Gates College Gymnasium, located at 509 L St. (Highway 275) in Neligh, Nebraska, was built in 1892. It was listed on the National Register of Historic Places in 1981. It was then serving as Gates County Museum.

It is a two-story brick building about 30 by 50 feet (9.1 m × 15.2 m) in plan, with a hipped roof. One entrance goes to the first floor, which was the men's gymnasium area, and a separate entrance goes to the second floor, which was the women's gym. Gates College ceased to operate as a college in the 1890s and the building was sold to the county. The building became the Antelope County Jail in 1901, with installation of three cells in the first floor.

Brickwork in the building was done by T. H. Brenton, and carpentry work by C. E. Spaulding, both men from Neligh.

In 1964, when a new jail facility was completed, the building was turned over to the Antelope County Historical Society for use as a museum. The Society no longer uses it as a museum.
