= Downtown Neligh Historic District =

Historic district in Nebraska, United States

- U.S. National Register of Historic Places
- Location within Nebraska Location within the United States
- Location: Main St. from 5th to 2nd Sts., Neligh, Nebraska
- Coordinates: 42°07′43″N 98°01′48″W
- NRHP reference No.: 100001796
- Added to NRHP: November 9, 2017

The Downtown Neligh Historic District, in Neligh, Nebraska, is a historic district which was listed on the National Register of Historic Places in 2017.

It is generally along Main St. from 5th to 2nd Streets in Neligh.

A map of the district shows it runs from 202 to 502 on the west side of Main Street, and somewhat less far on the east side, and it includes a few buildings on the cross streets.
