= Antelope County News =

American weekly newspaper in Nebraska

- Type: Weekly newspaper
- Format: Broadsheet
- Owner: Pitzer Digital LLC
- Publisher: Carrie Pitzer
- Editor: Jenny Higgins
- Founded: 1901
- Headquarters: Neligh, Nebraska
- Circulation: 2,558
- Sister newspapers: Knox County News
- Website: antelopecountynews.com

The Antelope County News is a weekly newspaper and website located in Neligh, Nebraska, owned by Pitzer Digital, LLC.

The Antelope County News was launched in digital-only form on January 1, 2014, by publisher and owner Carrie Pitzer. On February 11, 2016, Pitzer Digital purchased The Orchard News from John and Lucy Ferguson, and transformed it into the first county-wide print publication in Antelope County as the Antelope County News/Orchard News. It immediately became the first color newspaper in Antelope County.

The Orchard News began publishing in 1901 in the community of Orchard.

== Other media ==
The Antelope County News collaborates with other media and has been used as a credible source for multiple publications, including the Lincoln Journal-Star, Kansas City Star, Omaha World-Herald, North Platte Telegraph, The State, AOL, Valley News, Daytona Daily News, Atlanta Journal-Constitution, New York Daily News.

Pitzer Digital LLC also owns the Bloomfield Monitor/Knox County News newspaper and Living Here magazine.

== Awards ==
The newspaper was named the top weekly newspaper in Nebraska in 2018, winning the Loral Johnson Community Sweepstakes Award from the Nebraska Press Association. The publication also won 35 awards at the 2018 Better Newspaper Contest.
