= Ord Township, Antelope County, Nebraska =

Ord Township
- Township
- Location in Antelope County
- Coordinates: 42°07′31″N 098°07′53″W
- Country: United States
- State: Nebraska
- County: Antelope

Area
  - Total: 35.80 sq mi (92.72 km^{2})
  - Land: 35.59 sq mi (92.19 km^{2})
  - Water: 0.20 sq mi (0.53 km^{2}) 0.57%
- Elevation: 1,800 ft (550 m)

Population (2010)
  - Total: 79
  - Density: 2.3/sq mi (0.9/km^{2})
- GNIS feature ID: 0838177

Ord Township is one of twenty-four townships in Antelope County, Nebraska, United States. The population was 79 at the 2010 census.

== See also ==
- County government in Nebraska
