= Robert Almer Harper =

American botanist

- Born: January 21, 1862; Le Claire, Iowa
- Died: May 12, 1946 (aged 84); Bedford, Virginia
- Education: Ph.D.
- Alma mater: Oberlin College; University of Bonn
- Occupation: Botanist
- Spouse(s): Alice Jean McQueen (1899–1909); Helen Sherman (1918–1946)
- Parent(s): Almer Sexton Harper; Eunice Thompson

Robert Almer Harper (January 21, 1862 – May 12, 1946) was an American botanist.

The younger brother of Edward Thompson Harper, Robert was born in Le Claire, Iowa to Congressional Minister Almer Harper and Eunice Thompson. The family moved to Port Byron, Illinois in 1863, where Robert attended local schools. He matriculated to Oberlin College, his father's alma mater, where he graduated with a A. B. in 1886. During the Fall of 1886 he performed graduate studies at Johns Hopkins University, then he was professor of Greek and Latin at Gates College in Neligh, Nebraska during 1886–88.

In 1889–91 he was an instructor at the Lake Forest Academy. After receiving his A. M. degree from Oberlin, he was appointed professor of botany and geology in 1891–98 at Lake Forest University. During the period 1894 to 1896, took a sabbatical to attend graduate school at the University of Bonn in Germany where he studied cytology and mycology; he was awarded a Ph.D. in 1896.

Harper became Professor of Botany at the University of Wisconsin in 1898, where he taught until 1911. On June 25, 1899, he was married to Alice Jean McQueen; she died in 1909. Harper was elected to the American Philosophical Society that same year. After a stint as visiting professor at the University of California in 1911, he was named Torrey Professor of Botany at Columbia University, becoming head of the botany department. The same year, Professor Harper was named a fellow of the American Academy of Arts and Sciences.

A member of the Torrey Botanical Club since 1911, he was named president during 1914–16. He served as president of the Botanical Society of America in 1916. Harper remarried in 1918 to Helen Sherman; they had one son, who became a farmer in Bedford, Virginia. Beginning in 1918, he served as head of the board of scientific directors for the New York Botanical Garden. He was named professor emeritus in 1930, then in 1938 he retired to a farm in Bedford. During his career he was awarded honorary doctorates from Columbia University and the University of Pennsylvania.

== Bibliography ==
He published the following works:

- Opuscula, 1895
- Beitrag zur Kenntniss der Kerntheilung und Sporenbildung, 1896
- Die Entwickelung des Peritheciums bei Sphaerotheca Castagnei, 1896
- Ueber das Verhalten der Kerne bei der Fruchtentwickelung einiger Ascomyceten, 1896
- Kerntheilung und freie Zellbildung, 1897
- Cell-division in Sporangia and Asci, 1899
- Cell and Nuclear division in Fuligo varians, 1900
- Binucleate cells in certain Hymenomycetes, 1902
- Nuclear divisions and nuclear fusion in Coloesporium sonchi-arvensis, 1903, with R. J. Holden
- Hamilton Greenwood Timberlake, 1904
- Sexual Reproduction and the Organization of the Nucleus in Certain Mildews, 1905
- Sex-determining factors in plants, 1907
- The Organization of Certain Coenobic Plants, 1908
- Nuclear phenomena of sexual reproduction in fungi, 1910
- The structure and development of the colony in Gonium, 1912
- Some current conceptions of the germ plasm, 1912
- Cleavage in Didymium mclanospermum, 1914
- Physical factors in cleavage of coenocytes, 1914
- Starchy and sugary foods, 1914
- On the nature of types in Pediastrum, 1916
- Organization reproduction and inheritance in Pediastrum, 1918
- The evolution of cell types and contact and pressure responses in Pediastrum, 1918
- Binary fission and surface tension in the development of the colony in Volvox, 1918
- The structure of protoplasm, 1919
- Inheritance of sugar and starch characters in corn, 1920
- The Stimulation of Research after the War, 1920
- The species concept from the point of view of a morphologist, 1923
- Cytology, 1924
- Morphogenesis in Dictyostelium, 1926
- Significance of taxonomic units and their natural basis, 1929
- Morphogenesis in Polysphondylium, 1929
- The nature and functions of plastids, especially elaioplasts, 1929
- Organization and light relations in Polysphondylium, 1932
- Plant Science in the Service of Art, 1933
