= Bazile Township, Antelope County, Nebraska =

Bazile Township, Nebraska
- Township
- Location in Antelope County
- Coordinates: 42°23′57″N 097°53′31″W
- Country: United States
- State: Nebraska
- County: Antelope

Area
  - Total: 35.99 sq mi (93.21 km^{2})
  - Land: 35.96 sq mi (93.13 km^{2})
  - Water: 0.031 sq mi (0.08 km^{2}) 0.08%
- Elevation: 1,710 ft (520 m)

Population (2010)
  - Total: 175
  - Density: 4.9/sq mi (1.9/km^{2})
- GNIS feature ID: 0837868

Bazile Township is one of twenty-four townships in Antelope County, Nebraska, United States. The population was 175 at the 2010 census.

== See also ==
- County government in Nebraska
