= Royal Township, Antelope County, Nebraska =

Royal Township
- Township
- Location in Antelope County
- Coordinates: 42°17′57″N 098°06′59″W
- Country: United States
- State: Nebraska
- County: Antelope

Area
  - Total: 35.72 sq mi (92.52 km^{2})
  - Land: 35.72 sq mi (92.52 km^{2})
  - Water: 0 sq mi (0 km^{2}) 0%
- Elevation: 1,900 ft (579 m)

Population (2010)
  - Total: 163
  - Density: 4.7/sq mi (1.8/km^{2})
- GNIS feature ID: 0838220

Royal Township is one of twenty-four townships in Antelope County, Nebraska, United States. The population was 163 at the 2010 census.

The village of Royal lies within the township.

== See also ==
- County government in Nebraska
