= Bean Cemetery =

Historic African American cemetery in Arkansas, United States

- U.S. National Register of Historic Places
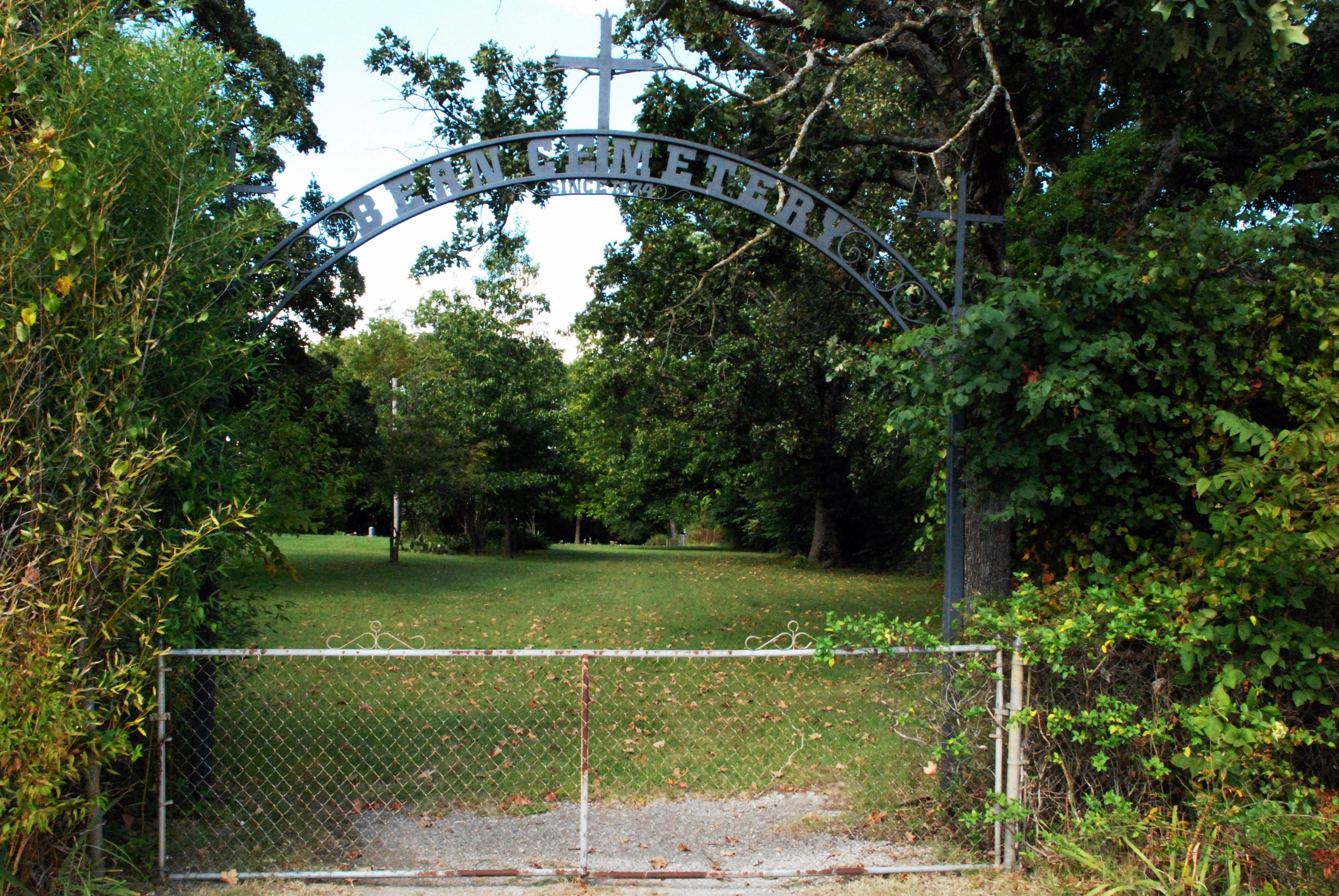

- Location within Arkansas Location within the United States
- Location: N. side US 62, about 2.2 mi. W of the jct. with AR 45, Lincoln, Arkansas
- Coordinates: 35°56′56″N 94°25′1″W
- Area: 3 acres (1.2 ha)
- NRHP reference No.: 94000152
- Added to NRHP: March 7, 1994

The Bean Cemetery is a historic African American cemetery in Lincoln, Arkansas. It is located on the east side of the city, on the north side of United States Route 62 just west of Meade Avenue, north of a small roadside picnic area that was once part of the property.

== Description of the property ==
The cemetery occupies a roughly trapezoidal plot of 2.45 acres (0.99 ha). Its oldest dated burial is to 1874, although there may be older unmarked or illegible burials. The cemetery is the best-preserved remnant of 19th-century African-American communities that dotted the region in the post-Civil War era.

Bean Cemetery contains 251 known burials and remains active. The application for the National Register of Historic Places states that the oldest death date is 1874.

The site was associated with the Colored Methodist Episcopal Church and School. Those buildings were demolished, and the site is now a roadside picnic area. The cemetery was listed on the National Register of Historic Places in 1994.

== See also ==
- National Register of Historic Places listings in Washington County, Arkansas
