= Clearwater Township, Antelope County, Nebraska =

Clearwater Township
- Township
- Location in Antelope County
- Coordinates: 42°07′50″N 098°14′13″W
- Country: United States
- State: Nebraska
- County: Antelope

Area
  - Total: 35.81 sq mi (92.75 km^{2})
  - Land: 35.78 sq mi (92.66 km^{2})
  - Water: 0.035 sq mi (0.09 km^{2}) 0.10%
- Elevation: 1,893 ft (577 m)

Population (2010)
  - Total: 554
  - Density: 16/sq mi (6/km^{2})
- ZIP code: 68726
- Area codes: 402 and 531
- GNIS feature ID: 0837925

Clearwater Township is one of twenty-four townships in Antelope County, Nebraska, United States. The population was 554 at the 2010 census.

The village of Clearwater lies within the township.

== See also ==
- County government in Nebraska
