= Neligh Mill =

- Neligh Mill State Historic Site
- U.S. National Register of Historic Places
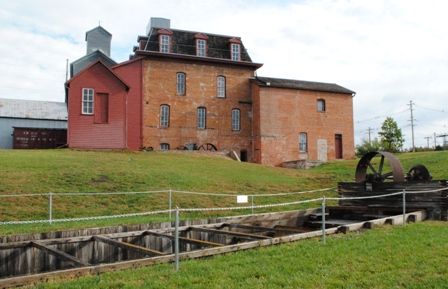
- Neligh Mill, with flume in foreground

- Location within Nebraska Location within the United States
- Location: N Street at Wylie Drive, Neligh, Nebraska
- Coordinates: 42.126238°N 98.030604°W
- Built: 1873
- NRHP reference No.: 69000128

The Neligh Mill is a water-powered flour mill in the city of Neligh in the northeastern part of the state of Nebraska in the Midwestern United States. The mill was built in 1873 by John Neligh, the city's founder, to make use of water power from the Elkhorn River. It operated for nearly one hundred years until it closed in 1969.

The Nebraska State Historical Society maintains the mill complex and describes it as the only 19th-century mill in the state that still possesses all of the original equipment used when it was in operation. The mill is listed in the National Register of Historic Places.

== History ==
John D. Neligh, founder of the Nebraska town of Neligh, began building the brick mill on the Elkhorn River in 1873. Another Neligh businessman, W. C. Gallaway, took over the mill and completed construction, including damming the Elkhorn River. A water turbine, which was positioned horizontally, powered the gear in the mill's basement. On August 29, 1874, the mill began operation, grinding wheat, corn, and buckwheat.

In 1886 the mill converted from stone mill burrs to modern steel rollers. It provided flour and meal for customers across Nebraska, as well as the War Department and Indian Bureau. Improvements in the mill's turbines allowed it to generate electrical power for the town, supplying it until 1925.

== Current museum ==
The Neligh Mill is now run by the Nebraska Historical Society as a museum commemorating the importance of flour mills to Nebraska and the West as a whole. Exhibits relating to the operation of the mill and its history are located in the original warehouse from 1866, as well as the 1915 addition where the power plant was once housed. The Society has restored the mill's office building, which has original furnishings. It reconstructed the 1919 flume to the south. The remnants of the dam that collected water for the mill are still visible on the Elkhorn River nearby.

== Gallery ==
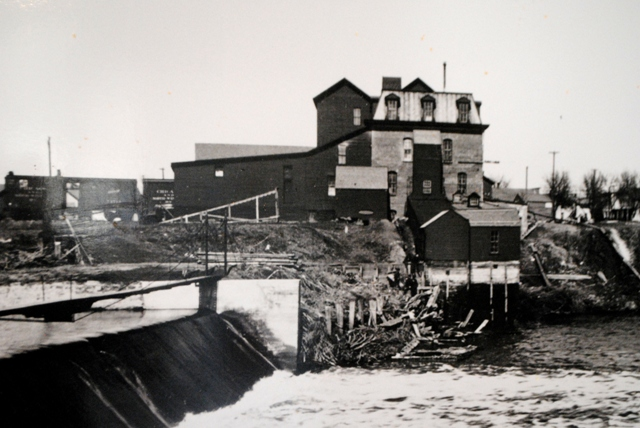
An old photograph of the Neligh Mill shows a thriving enterprise on the banks of the Elkhorn River.

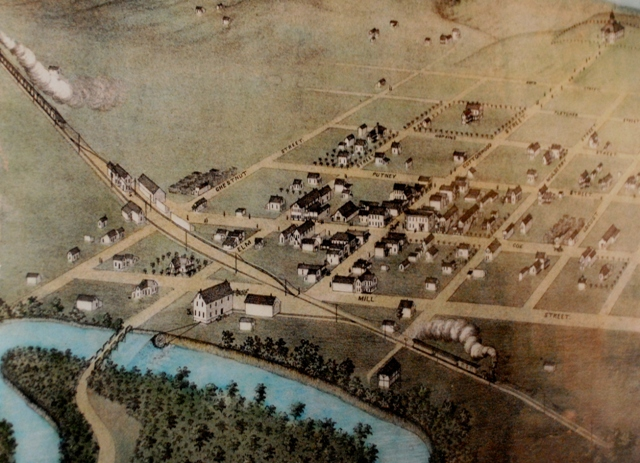
The Neligh Mill can be seen on the Elkhorn River in an old print of the town.

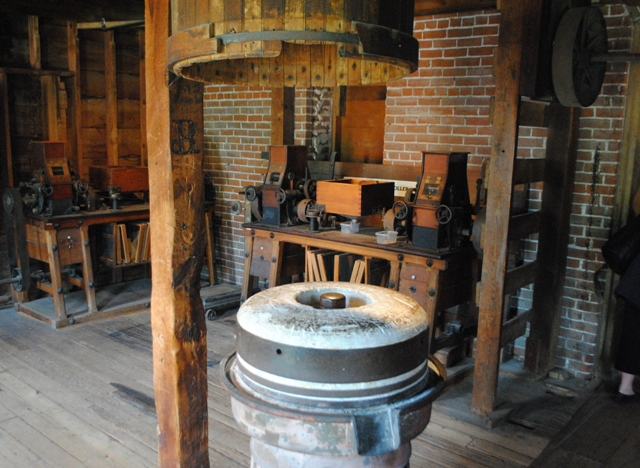
The Neligh Mill Museum displays one of the original stone burrs or millstones from its early years.

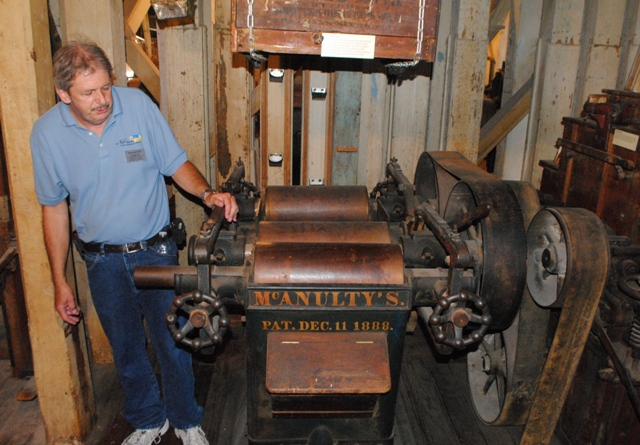
Don Ofe, the Site Administrator of the Neligh Mill, explains how a roller mill from 1888 grinds the wheat into flour.
