= Sherman Township, Antelope County, Nebraska =

Sherman Township
- Township
- Location in Antelope County
- Coordinates: 42°23′27″N 098°14′27″W
- Country: United States
- State: Nebraska
- County: Antelope

Area
  - Total: 35.81 sq mi (92.75 km^{2})
  - Land: 35.77 sq mi (92.65 km^{2})
  - Water: 0.039 sq mi (0.10 km^{2}) 0.11%
- Elevation: 1,755 ft (535 m)

Population (2010)
  - Total: 103
  - Density: 2.8/sq mi (1.1/km^{2})
- GNIS feature ID: 0838246

Sherman Township is one of twenty-four townships in Antelope County, Nebraska, United States. The population was 103 at the 2010 census.

== See also ==
- County government in Nebraska
