= Cedar Township, Antelope County, Nebraska =

Cedar Township
- Township
- Location in Antelope County
- Coordinates: 41°57′32″N 098°00′32″W
- Country: United States
- State: Nebraska
- County: Antelope

Area
  - Total: 35.53 sq mi (92.02 km^{2})
  - Land: 35.53 sq mi (92.02 km^{2})
  - Water: 0 sq mi (0 km^{2}) 0%
- Elevation: 1,841 ft (561 m)

Population (2010)
  - Total: 137
  - Density: 3.9/sq mi (1.5/km^{2})
- GNIS feature ID: 0837903

Cedar Township is one of twenty-four townships in Antelope County, Nebraska, United States. The population was 137 at the 2010 census.

== See also ==
- County government in Nebraska
