= Brunswick, Nebraska =

Village in Nebraska, US

- Village
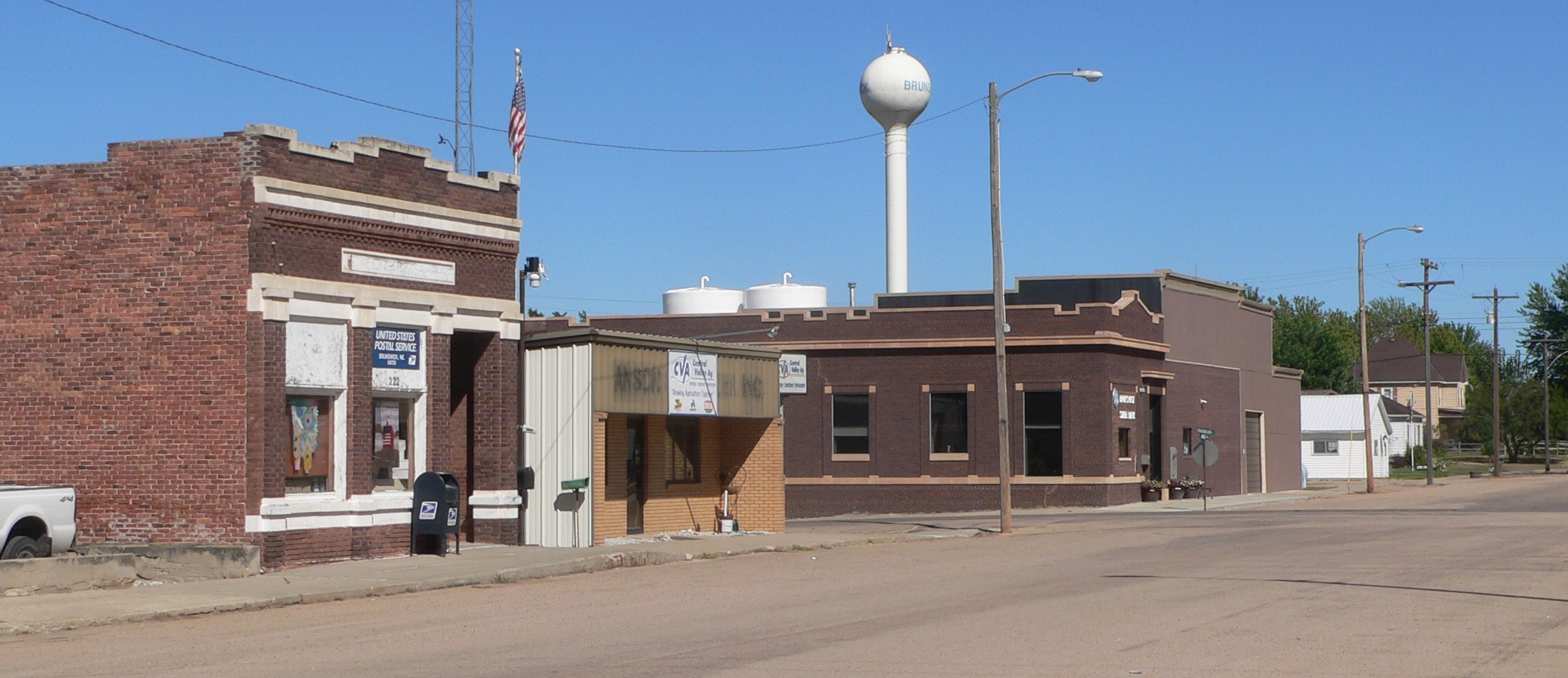
- Downtown Brunswick: Second Street, September 2012

- Location of Brunswick, Nebraska
- Coordinates: 42°20′16″N 97°58′18″W
- Country: United States
- State: Nebraska
- County: Antelope

Area
  - Total: 0.59 sq mi (1.54 km^{2})
  - Land: 0.59 sq mi (1.54 km^{2})
  - Water: 0 sq mi (0.00 km^{2})
- Elevation: 1,864 ft (568 m)

Population (2020)
  - Total: 152
  - Density: 255.7/sq mi (98.74/km^{2})
- Time zone: UTC-6 (Central (CST))
  - Summer (DST): UTC-5 (CDT)
- ZIP code: 68720
- Area code: 402
- FIPS code: 31-06890
- GNIS feature ID: 2397478

Brunswick is a village in Antelope County, Nebraska, United States. As of the 2020 census, Brunswick had a population of 152.

== History ==
Brunswick was founded in 1879. A large share of the early settlers being natives of Germany caused the name Brunswick to be selected. According to another source, a local beet grower named the town after Brunswick, Germany, which was also a center of beet production.

== Geography ==
According to the United States Census Bureau, the village has a total area of 0.59 square miles (1.53 km^{2}), all land.

== Demographics ==
Historical population
Census	Pop.	Note	%±
1910	278		—
1920	359		29.1%
1930	352		−1.9%
1940	189		−46.3%
1950	260		37.6%
1960	254		−2.3%
1970	229		−9.8%
1980	190		−17.0%
1990	182		−4.2%
2000	179		−1.6%
2010	138		−22.9%
2020	152		10.1%
U.S. Decennial Census

=== 2010 census ===
As of the census of 2010, there were 138 people, 68 households, and 43 families living in the village. The population density was 233.9 inhabitants per square mile (90.3/km^{2}). There were 72 housing units at an average density of 122.0 per square mile (47.1/km^{2}). The racial makeup of the village was 100.0% White.

There were 68 households, of which 17.6% had children under the age of 18 living with them, 58.8% were married couples living together, 2.9% had a female householder with no husband present, 1.5% had a male householder with no wife present, and 36.8% were non-families. 35.3% of all households were made up of individuals, and 17.6% had someone living alone who was 65 years of age or older. The average household size was 2.03 and the average family size was 2.60.

The median age in the village was 49 years. 16.7% of residents were under the age of 18; 7.9% were between the ages of 18 and 24; 18% were from 25 to 44; 27.5% were from 45 to 64; and 29.7% were 65 years of age or older. The gender makeup of the village was 54.3% male and 45.7% female.

=== 2000 census ===
As of the census of 2000, there were 179 people, 71 households, and 47 families living in the village. The population density was 301.9 inhabitants per square mile (116.6/km^{2}). There were 81 housing units at an average density of 136.6 per square mile (52.7/km^{2}). The racial makeup of the village was 97.77% White, 0.56% African American, 1.12% Native American, and 0.56% from two or more races. Hispanic or Latino of any race were 0.56% of the population.

There were 71 households, out of which 31.0% had children under the age of 18 living with them, 60.6% were married couples living together, 4.2% had a female householder with no husband present, and 32.4% were non-families. 32.4% of all households were made up of individuals, and 21.1% had someone living alone who was 65 years of age or older. The average household size was 2.52 and the average family size was 3.17.

In the village, the population was spread out, with 29.6% under the age of 18, 4.5% from 18 to 24, 20.7% from 25 to 44, 25.1% from 45 to 64, and 20.1% who were 65 years of age or older. The median age was 42 years. For every 100 females, there were 80.8 males. For every 100 females age 18 and over, there were 90.9 males.

As of 2000 the median income for a household in the village was $23,750, and the median income for a family was $33,438. Males had a median income of $30,625 versus $6,250 for females. The per capita income for the village was $16,159. About 20.8% of families and 25.3% of the population were below the poverty line, including 34.4% of those under the age of eighteen and 3.2% of those 65 or over.

== See also ==
- List of municipalities in Nebraska
