= Lincoln Township, Daviess County, Missouri =

Township in Daviess County, Missouri, U.S.

Lincoln Township
- Township
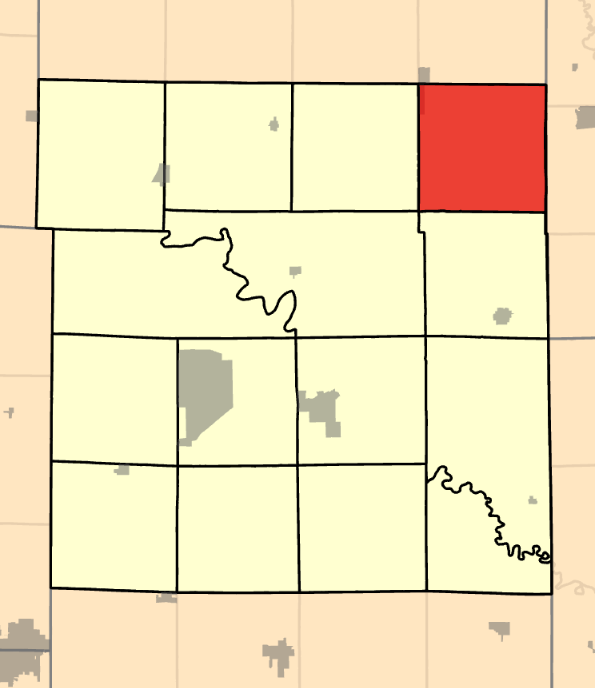
- Coordinates: 40°04′58″N 93°49′48″W
- Country: United States
- State: Missouri
- County: Daviess

Area
  - Total: 35.98 sq mi (93.2 km^{2})
  - Land: 35.92 sq mi (93.0 km^{2})
  - Water: 0.06 sq mi (0.16 km^{2}) 0.17%
- Elevation: 971 ft (296 m)

Population (2020)
  - Total: 100
  - Density: 2.8/sq mi (1.1/km^{2})
- FIPS code: 29-06142698
- GNIS feature ID: 766584

Lincoln Township is a township in Daviess County, Missouri, United States. At the 2020 census, its population was 100.

Lincoln Township was established in 1866, and named after President Abraham Lincoln.
