= Lincoln Township, Christian County, Missouri =

Township in Christian County, Missouri, U.S.

Coordinates: 37°02′17″N 93°26′13″W

Lincoln Township is an inactive township in Christian County, Missouri. The township was named after Abraham Lincoln, the 16th President of the United States.

Wilson's Creek National Battlefield is partly in this township.
