= Lincoln Township, Grundy County, Missouri =

Township in Grundy County, Missouri

Coordinates: 40.162895°N 93.575246°W

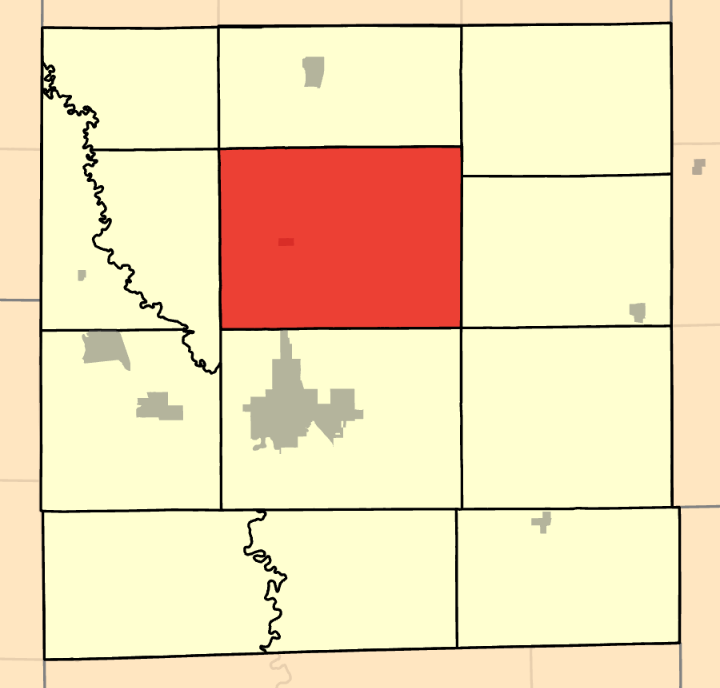

Lincoln Township is a township in Grundy County, in the U.S. state of Missouri.

Lincoln Township was established in 1872, most likely taking its name from President Abraham Lincoln.
