= Oakdale, Nebraska =

Village in Nebraska, US

- Village
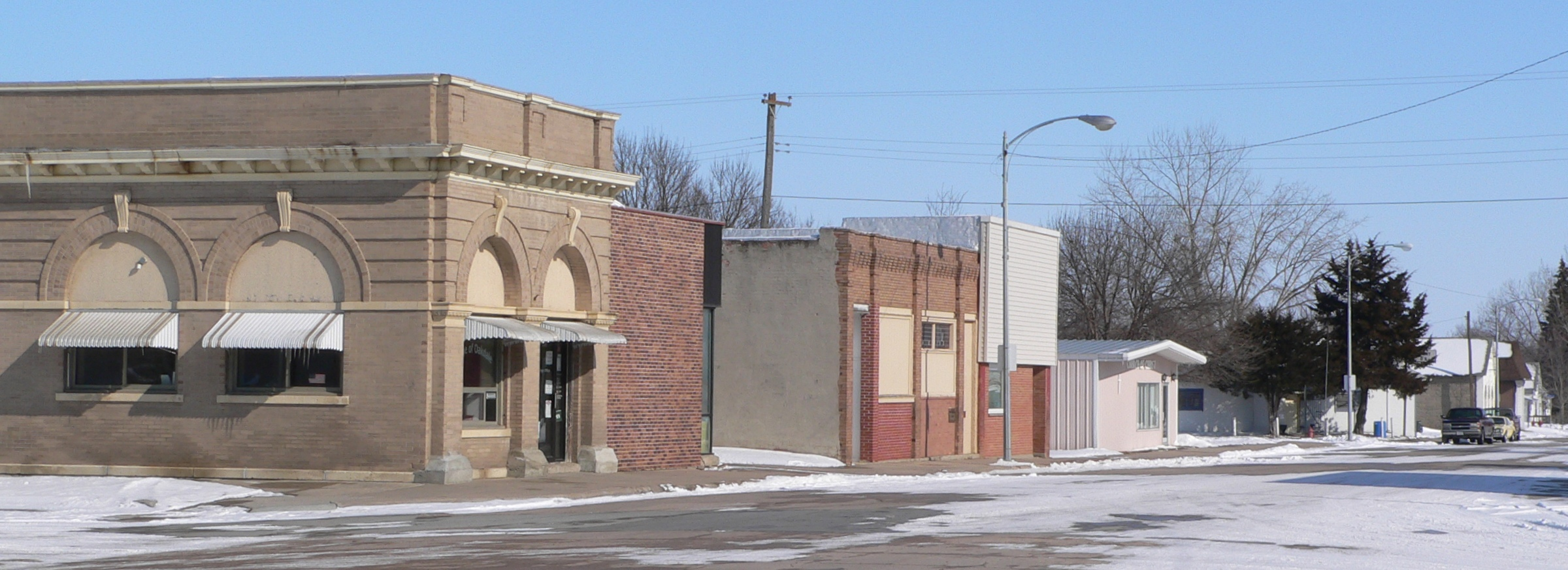
- North side of 5th Street in Oakdale. The building at left is the village hall.

- Location of Oakdale, Nebraska
- Coordinates: 42°04′12″N 97°58′02″W
- Country: United States
- State: Nebraska
- County: Antelope

Area
  - Total: 0.52 sq mi (1.35 km^{2})
  - Land: 0.52 sq mi (1.35 km^{2})
  - Water: 0 sq mi (0.00 km^{2})
- Elevation: 1,713 ft (522 m)

Population (2020)
  - Total: 276
  - Density: 531.0/sq mi (205.02/km^{2})
- Time zone: UTC-6 (Central (CST))
  - Summer (DST): UTC-5 (CDT)
- ZIP code: 68761
- Area code: 402
- FIPS code: 31-35385
- GNIS feature ID: 2399541
- Website: www.villageofoakdale.com

Oakdale is a village in Antelope County, Nebraska, United States. As of the 2020 census, Oakdale had a population of 276.

== History ==
Oakdale was laid out and platted in 1872. It was named from the numerous oak groves in the area. Oakdale was incorporated as a village in 1882.

== Geography ==
According to the United States Census Bureau, the village has a total area of 0.52 square miles (1.35 km^{2}), all land.

== Demographics ==
Historical population
| Census | Pop. | Note | %± |
|---|---|---|---|
| 1880 | 338 | | — |
| 1890 | 630 | | 86.4% |
| 1900 | 585 | | −7.1% |
| 1910 | 631 | | 7.9% |
| 1920 | 707 | | 12.0% |
| 1930 | 663 | | −6.2% |
| 1940 | 561 | | −15.4% |
| 1950 | 502 | | −10.5% |
| 1960 | 397 | | −20.9% |
| 1970 | 322 | | −18.9% |
| 1980 | 410 | | 27.3% |
| 1990 | 362 | | −11.7% |
| 2000 | 345 | | −4.7% |
| 2010 | 322 | | −6.7% |
| 2020 | 276 | | −14.3% |
U.S. Decennial Census

=== 2010 census ===
As of the census of 2010, there were 322 people, 134 households, and 91 families residing in the village. The population density was 619.2 inhabitants per square mile (239.1/km^{2}). There were 160 housing units at an average density of 307.7 per square mile (118.8/km^{2}). The racial makeup of the village was 95.0% White, 1.2% African American, 0.9% Native American, 1.9% from other races, and 0.9% from two or more races. Hispanic or Latino of any race were 5.3% of the population.

There were 134 households, of which 27.6% had children under the age of 18 living with them, 45.5% were married couples living together, 15.7% had a female householder with no husband present, 6.7% had a male householder with no wife present, and 32.1% were non-families. 28.4% of all households were made up of individuals, and 12% had someone living alone who was 65 years of age or older. The average household size was 2.40 and the average family size was 2.87.

The median age in the village was 43.5 years. 22.7% of residents were under the age of 18; 7.1% were between the ages of 18 and 24; 21.8% were from 25 to 44; 29.2% were from 45 to 64; and 19.3% were 65 years of age or older. The gender makeup of the village was 49.1% male and 50.9% female.

=== 2000 census ===
As of the census of 2000, there were 345 people, 140 households, and 97 families residing in the village. The population density was 664.4 inhabitants per square mile (256.5/km^{2}). There were 163 housing units at an average density of 313.9 per square mile (121.2/km^{2}). The racial makeup of the village was 98.84% White, 0.87% Native American, 0.29% from other races. Hispanic or Latino of any race were 0.58% of the population.

There were 140 households, out of which 31.4% had children under the age of 18 living with them, 60.0% were married couples living together, 6.4% had a female householder with no husband present, and 30.7% were non-families. 29.3% of all households were made up of individuals, and 14.3% had someone living alone who was 65 years of age or older. The average household size was 2.46 and the average family size was 2.97.

In the village, the population was spread out, with 26.4% under the age of 18, 5.5% from 18 to 24, 24.1% from 25 to 44, 25.8% from 45 to 64, and 18.3% who were 65 years of age or older. The median age was 41 years. For every 100 females, there were 102.9 males. For every 100 females age 18 and over, there were 104.8 males.

As of 2000 the median income for a household in the village was $27,500, and the median income for a family was $30,139. Males had a median income of $22,917 versus $20,469 for females. The per capita income for the village was $11,979. About 9.3% of families and 13.9% of the population were below the poverty line, including 28.6% of those under age 18 and 6.3% of those age 65 or over.

== Climate ==
This climatic region is typified by large seasonal temperature differences, with warm to hot (and often humid) summers and cold (sometimes severely cold) winters. According to the Köppen Climate Classification system, Oakdale has a humid continental climate, abbreviated "Dfa" on climate maps.

Climate data for Oakdale, Nebraska (1991–2020, extremes 1893–present)
| Month | Jan | Feb | Mar | Apr | May | Jun | Jul | Aug | Sep | Oct | Nov | Dec | Year |
|---|---|---|---|---|---|---|---|---|---|---|---|---|---|
| Record high °F (°C) | 74 (23) | 76 (24) | 90 (32) | 101 (38) | 107 (42) | 107 (42) | 115 (46) | 111 (44) | 103 (39) | 96 (36) | 84 (29) | 75 (24) | 115 (46) |
| Mean maximum °F (°C) | 58.4 (14.7) | 62.2 (16.8) | 75.1 (23.9) | 83.1 (28.4) | 88.7 (31.5) | 93.4 (34.1) | 95.2 (35.1) | 93.8 (34.3) | 90.8 (32.7) | 84.9 (29.4) | 73.1 (22.8) | 59.7 (15.4) | 97.0 (36.1) |
| Mean daily maximum °F (°C) | 31.8 (−0.1) | 36.0 (2.2) | 47.4 (8.6) | 58.7 (14.8) | 68.8 (20.4) | 78.8 (26.0) | 83.2 (28.4) | 81.1 (27.3) | 74.9 (23.8) | 62.0 (16.7) | 47.4 (8.6) | 35.0 (1.7) | 58.8 (14.9) |
| Daily mean °F (°C) | 21.1 (−6.1) | 25.1 (−3.8) | 36.0 (2.2) | 47.0 (8.3) | 58.0 (14.4) | 68.5 (20.3) | 73.1 (22.8) | 70.8 (21.6) | 62.5 (16.9) | 49.2 (9.6) | 35.6 (2.0) | 24.5 (−4.2) | 47.6 (8.7) |
| Mean daily minimum °F (°C) | 10.4 (−12.0) | 14.1 (−9.9) | 24.6 (−4.1) | 35.2 (1.8) | 47.2 (8.4) | 58.3 (14.6) | 63.0 (17.2) | 60.5 (15.8) | 50.2 (10.1) | 36.4 (2.4) | 23.7 (−4.6) | 14.1 (−9.9) | 36.5 (2.5) |
| Mean minimum °F (°C) | −13.1 (−25.1) | −7.8 (−22.1) | 2.7 (−16.3) | 18.7 (−7.4) | 31.0 (−0.6) | 43.3 (6.3) | 49.2 (9.6) | 47.4 (8.6) | 33.5 (0.8) | 19.3 (−7.1) | 4.7 (−15.2) | −8.9 (−22.7) | −17.7 (−27.6) |
| Record low °F (°C) | −38 (−39) | −33 (−36) | −25 (−32) | −8 (−22) | 20 (−7) | 33 (1) | 38 (3) | 35 (2) | 17 (−8) | 4 (−16) | −16 (−27) | −33 (−36) | −38 (−39) |
| Average precipitation inches (mm) | 0.52 (13) | 0.73 (19) | 1.47 (37) | 2.87 (73) | 4.13 (105) | 4.35 (110) | 3.11 (79) | 3.94 (100) | 2.32 (59) | 2.34 (59) | 1.07 (27) | 0.73 (19) | 27.58 (701) |
| Average snowfall inches (cm) | 6.9 (18) | 5.7 (14) | 5.9 (15) | 2.6 (6.6) | 0.0 (0.0) | 0.0 (0.0) | 0.0 (0.0) | 0.0 (0.0) | 0.0 (0.0) | 0.9 (2.3) | 4.0 (10) | 5.4 (14) | 31.4 (80) |
| Average precipitation days (≥ 0.01 in) | 5.4 | 6.1 | 7.4 | 9.5 | 11.0 | 10.7 | 8.5 | 8.5 | 7.0 | 7.0 | 4.7 | 5.4 | 91.2 |
| Average snowy days (≥ 0.1 in) | 4.8 | 4.5 | 4.1 | 1.2 | 0.0 | 0.0 | 0.0 | 0.0 | 0.0 | 0.8 | 2.5 | 4.4 | 22.3 |
Source: NOAA

== 1999 snakes incident ==
Oakdale was briefly famous nationwide in 1999 when actor and comedian Steve Carell visited Oakdale to interview Raymond Branz, a local herpetologist and venom researcher, whose snakes would sometimes escape and distress the village. Carell has referred to that early interview over the years, most recently at a June 2022 speech in the Kennedy Center in Washington, D.C..

== See also ==
- List of municipalities in Nebraska
