= Lincoln Township, Dallas County, Missouri =

Inactive township in the US state of Missouri

Coordinates: 37.859759°N 93.129807°W

Lincoln Township is an inactive township in Dallas County, in the U.S. state of Missouri.

Lincoln Township was established in 1868, taking its name from President Abraham Lincoln.
