= Lincoln Township, Stone County, Missouri =

Inactive township in the US state of Missouri

Coordinates: 36.8497°N 93.5314°W

Lincoln Township is an inactive township in Stone County, Missouri, founded in 1870 and named for Abraham Lincoln, the then-recently deceased 16th President of the United States.
