= Lincoln Township, Lawrence County, Missouri =

Inactive township in the US state of Missouri

Coordinates: 37.2344°N 93.8022°W

Lincoln Township is an inactive township in Lawrence County, in the U.S. state of Missouri.

Lincoln Township has the name of President Abraham Lincoln.
