= Lincoln Township, Marshall County, Minnesota =

Lincoln Township, Minnesota
- Township
- Location of Lincoln Township, within Marshall County, Minnesota
- Coordinates: 48°29′39″N 96°27′6″W
- Country: United States
- State: Minnesota
- County: Marshall

Area
  - Total: 35.6 sq mi (92.1 km^{2})
  - Land: 35.6 sq mi (92.1 km^{2})
  - Water: 0 sq mi (0.0 km^{2})
- Elevation: 1,060 ft (323 m)

Population (2020)
  - Total: 81
  - Density: 2.3/sq mi (0.88/km^{2})
- Time zone: UTC-6 (Central (CST))
  - Summer (DST): UTC-5 (CDT)
- FIPS code: 27-37142
- GNIS feature ID: 0664786

Lincoln Township is a township in Marshall County, Minnesota, United States. The population was 81 at the 2020 census.

Lincoln Township was organized in 1892, and named for Abraham Lincoln, 16th President of the United States.

== Geography ==
According to the United States Census Bureau, the township has a total area of 35.6 square miles (92 km^{2}), all land.

== Demographics ==
As of the census of 2000, there were 124 people, 48 households, and 33 families residing in the township. The population density was 3.5 inhabitants per square mile (1.4/km^{2}). There were 62 housing units at an average density of 1.7 per square mile (0.66/km^{2}). The racial makeup of the township was 99.19% White, and 0.81% from two or more races.

There were 48 households, out of which 33.3% had children under the age of 18 living with them, 62.5% were married couples living together, 4.2% had a female householder with no husband present, and 29.2% were non-families. 27.1% of all households were made up of individuals, and 8.3% had someone living alone who was 65 years of age or older. The average household size was 2.58 and the average family size was 3.15.

In the township the population was spread out, with 28.2% under the age of 18, 5.6% from 18 to 24, 29.8% from 25 to 44, 25.0% from 45 to 64, and 11.3% who were 65 years of age or older. The median age was 35 years. For every 100 females, there were 117.5 males. For every 100 females age 18 and over, there were 102.3 males.

The median income for a household in the township was $33,125, and the median income for a family was $34,688. Males had a median income of $32,500 versus $20,000 for females. The per capita income for the township was $12,943. There were 12.9% of families and 26.2% of the population living below the poverty line, including 51.5% of under eighteens and 9.5% of those over 64.
