= Lincoln Township, Caldwell County, Missouri =

Lincoln Township
- Township
- Coordinates: 39°34′08″N 093°55′34″W
- Country: United States
- State: Missouri
- County: Caldwell

Area
  - Total: 36.59 sq mi (94.78 km^{2})
  - Land: 36.58 sq mi (94.73 km^{2})
  - Water: 0.015 sq mi (0.04 km^{2}) 0.04%
- Elevation: 968 ft (295 m)

Population (2000)
  - Total: 471
  - Density: 13/sq mi (5/km^{2})
- FIPS code: 29-42626
- GNIS feature ID: 0766366

Lincoln Township is one of twelve townships in Caldwell County, Missouri, and is part of the Kansas City metropolitan area with the USA. As of the 2000 census, its population was 471.

== History ==
Lincoln Township was established on November 4th, 1869, and named after President Abraham Lincoln.

== Geography ==
Lincoln Township covers an area of 36.59 square miles (94.8 km^{2}) and contains one incorporated settlement, Cowgill.
