= Lincoln Township, Antelope County, Nebraska =

Lincoln Township
- Township
- Location in Antelope County
- Coordinates: 41°57′46″N 098°14′26″W
- Country: United States
- State: Nebraska
- County: Antelope

Area
  - Total: 35.49 sq mi (91.92 km^{2})
  - Land: 35.49 sq mi (91.92 km^{2})
  - Water: 0 sq mi (0 km^{2}) 0%
- Elevation: 1,998 ft (609 m)

Population (2010)
  - Total: 84
  - Density: 2.3/sq mi (0.9/km^{2})
- GNIS feature ID: 0838091

Lincoln Township is one of twenty-four townships in Antelope County, Nebraska, United States. The population was 84 at the 2010 census.

== See also ==
- County government in Nebraska
