= Lincoln Township, Clark County, Missouri =

Township in Clark County, Missouri, U.S.

Coordinates: 40.428687°N 91.768079°W

Lincoln Township is an inactive township in Clark County, in the U.S. state of Missouri.

Lincoln Township was established in 1868, taking the name of President Abraham Lincoln.
