= Lincoln Township, Douglas County, Missouri =

Township in Missouri, U.S.

Coordinates: 37°01′31″N 92°47′42″W

Lincoln Township is a township in western Douglas County, in the U.S. state of Missouri.
