= Verdigris Township, Holt County, Nebraska =

Verdigris Township
- Township
- Location in Holt County
- Coordinates: 42°23′20″N 098°23′15″W
- Country: United States
- State: Nebraska
- County: Holt

Area
  - Total: 53.81 sq mi (139.37 km^{2})
  - Land: 53.80 sq mi (139.34 km^{2})
  - Water: 0.012 sq mi (0.03 km^{2}) 0.02%
- Elevation: 1,982 ft (604 m)

Population (2020)
  - Total: 319
  - Density: 5.93/sq mi (2.29/km^{2})
- GNIS feature ID: 0838305

Verdigris Township is one of thirty-seven townships in Holt County, Nebraska, United States. The population was 319 at the 2020 census. A 2021 estimate placed the township's population at 313.

The Village of Page lies within the Township.

== See also ==
- County government in Nebraska
