= Verdigris Township, Antelope County, Nebraska =

Verdigris Township
- Township
- Location in Antelope County
- Coordinates: 42°23′53″N 098°07′24″W
- Country: United States
- State: Nebraska
- County: Antelope

Area
  - Total: 36.02 sq mi (93.29 km^{2})
  - Land: 35.92 sq mi (93.02 km^{2})
  - Water: 0.10 sq mi (0.27 km^{2}) 0.29%
- Elevation: 1,663 ft (507 m)

Population (2010)
  - Total: 78
  - Density: 2.1/sq mi (0.8/km^{2})
- GNIS feature ID: 0838304

Verdigris Township is one of twenty-four townships in Antelope County, Nebraska, United States. The population was 78 at the 2010 census.

== See also ==
- County government in Nebraska
