= Antelope County, Nebraska =

County in Nebraska, United States

- County
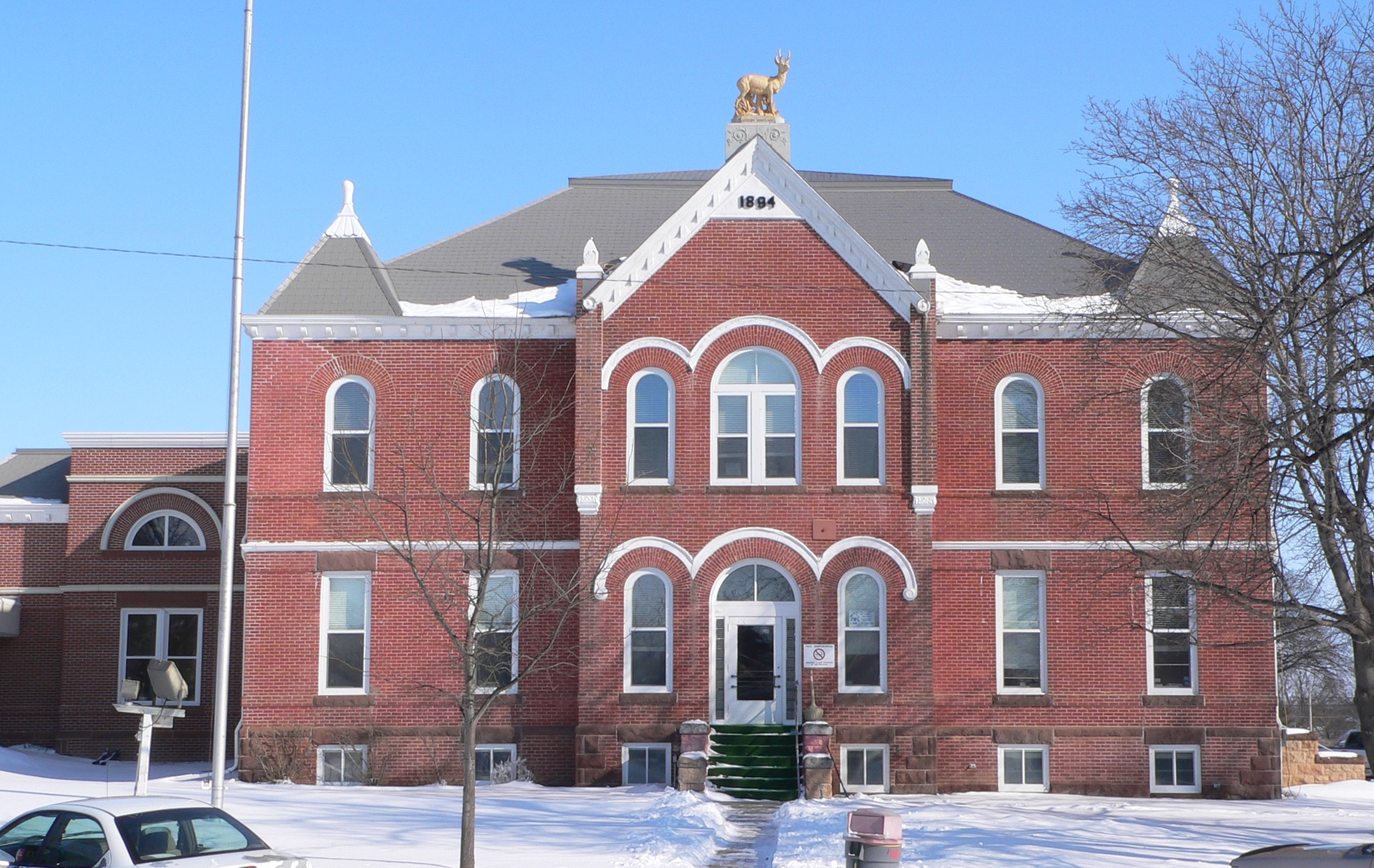
- The Antelope County Courthouse in Neligh

- Seal

- Location within the U.S. state of Nebraska
- Coordinates: 42.183225°N 98.058037°W
- Country: United States
- State: Nebraska
- Created: March 1, 1871
- Organized: June 15, 1871
- Named for: Pronghorn antelope
- Seat: Neligh
- Largest city: Neligh

Area
  - Total: 858.592 sq mi (2,223.74 km^{2})
  - Land: 857.157 sq mi (2,220.03 km^{2})
  - Water: 1.435 sq mi (3.72 km^{2}) 0.17%

Population (2020)
  - Total: 6,295
  - Estimate (2025): 6,352 ▲
  - Density: 7.344/sq mi (2.836/km^{2})
- Time zone: UTC−6 (Central)
  - Summer (DST): UTC−5 (CDT)
- Area code: 402 and 531
- Congressional district: 3rd
- Website: antelopecounty.nebraska.gov
- • Nebraska county number 02 • Nebraska license plate prefix 26

Antelope County is a county located in the U.S. state of Nebraska. As of the 2020 census, the population was 6,295, and was estimated to be 6,352 in 2025. The county seat and the largest city is Neligh. The Ashfall Fossil Beds National Natural Landmark is located within the county.

In the Nebraska license plate system, Antelope County was represented by the prefix "26" (as it had the 26th-largest number of vehicles registered in the state when the license plate system was established in 1922).

== History ==
Antelope county was created on March 1, 1871 and organized on June 15, 1871. Named for the pronghorn antelopes that roamed the region. The first known settler in the area was George St. Clair, known as "Ponca George," who made a claim in 1868. The county's initial settlement was slow due in part to popular views of Great American Desert as unsuitable for farming without significant effort in land reclamation. It received its name after a group of early settlers killed and ate several pronghorn. Although these are not true antelope, they are colloquially known by that name.

The growth of Antelope County was significantly influenced by the construction of railroads through the area. The Sioux City and Nebraska Railroad reached Neligh in 1879, which was then designated as the county seat. This connection to broader markets spurred agricultural development. Wheat, oats, and later corn became staple crops, and the county saw an influx of settlers after the railroad's arrival.

== Geography ==
According to the United States Census Bureau, the county has a total area of 858.592 square miles (2,223.74 km^{2}), of which 857.157 square miles (2,220.03 km^{2}) is land and 1.435 square miles (3.72 km^{2}) (0.17%) is water. It is the 24th-largest county in Nebraska by total area.

=== Major highways ===
- U.S. Highway 20
- U.S. Highway 275
- Nebraska Highway 13
- Nebraska Highway 14
- Nebraska Highway 45
- Nebraska Highway 70

=== Protected areas ===
- Ashfall Fossil Beds State Historical Park

=== Adjacent counties ===
- Pierce County – east
- Madison County – southeast
- Boone County – south
- Wheeler County – southwest
- Holt County – west
- Knox County – north

== Demographics ==
Historical population
Census	Pop.	Note	%±
1880	3,953		—
1890	10,399		163.1%
1900	11,344		9.1%
1910	14,003		23.4%
1920	15,243		8.9%
1930	15,206		−0.2%
1940	13,289		−12.6%
1950	11,264		−15.2%
1960	10,176		−9.7%
1970	9,047		−11.1%
1980	8,675		−4.1%
1990	7,965		−8.2%
2000	7,452		−6.4%
2010	6,685		−10.3%
2020	6,295		−5.8%
2025 (est.)	6,352	▲	0.9%
U.S. Decennial Census; 1790–1960 1900–1990; 1990–2000 2010–2020

=== 2020 census ===
As of the 2020 census, the county had a population of 6,295. The median age was 43.7 years. 23.4% of residents were under the age of 18 and 24.2% of residents were 65 years of age or older. For every 100 females there were 103.5 males, and for every 100 females age 18 and over there were 101.6 males age 18 and over.

The racial makeup of the county was 94.3% White, 0.3% Black or African American, 0.3% American Indian and Alaska Native, 0.3% Asian, 0.0% Native Hawaiian and Pacific Islander, 1.5% from some other race, and 3.2% from two or more races. Hispanic or Latino residents of any race comprised 3.5% of the population.

0.0% of residents lived in urban areas, while 100.0% lived in rural areas.

There were 2,670 households in the county, of which 25.0% had children under the age of 18 living with them and 21.3% had a female householder with no spouse or partner present. About 32.4% of all households were made up of individuals and 16.4% had someone living alone who was 65 years of age or older.

There were 3,112 housing units, of which 14.2% were vacant. Among occupied housing units, 74.5% were owner-occupied and 25.5% were renter-occupied. The homeowner vacancy rate was 2.0% and the rental vacancy rate was 9.9%.

=== 2000 census ===
As of the 2000 census, there were 7,452 people, 2,953 households, and 2,073 families in the county. The population density was 9 people per square mile (3.5 people/km^{2}). There were 3,346 housing units at an average density of 4 per square mile (1.5/km^{2}). The racial makeup of the county was 98.82% White, 0.05% Black or African American, 0.31% Native American, 0.05% Asian, 0.28% from other races, and 0.48% from two or more races. 0.70% of the population were Hispanic or Latino of any race. 57.9% were of German, 6.6% English, 6.6% American and 5.9% Irish ancestry.

There were 2,953 households, out of which 32.20% had children under the age of 18 living with them, 62.50% were married couples living together, 5.50% had a female householder with no husband present, and 29.80% were non-families. 27.80% of all households were made up of individuals, and 16.20% had someone living alone who was 65 years of age or older. The average household size was 2.49 and the average family size was 3.05.

The county population contained 27.50% under the age of 18, 6.20% from 18 to 24, 23.30% from 25 to 44, 23.20% from 45 to 64, and 19.90% who were 65 years of age or older. The median age was 41 years. For every 100 females there were 96.80 males. For every 100 females age 18 and over, there were 94.30 males.

The median income for a household in the county was $30,114, and the median income for a family was $36,240. Males had a median income of $26,288 versus $16,926 for females. The per capita income for the county was $14,601. About 10.30% of families and 13.60% of the population were below the poverty line, including 17.20% of those under age 18 and 11.90% of those age 65 or over.

== Communities ==
=== Cities ===
- Elgin
- Neligh (county seat)
- Tilden (part)

=== Villages ===
- Brunswick
- Clearwater
- Oakdale
- Orchard
- Royal

=== Townships ===
- Bazile
- Blaine
- Burnett
- Cedar
- Clearwater
- Crawford
- Custer
- Eden
- Elgin
- Ellsworth
- Elm
- Frenchtown
- Garfield
- Grant
- Lincoln
- Logan
- Neligh
- Oakdale
- Ord
- Royal
- Sherman
- Stanton
- Verdigris
- Willow

== Politics ==
Antelope County voters are strongly Republican. In only one national election since 1916 has the county selected the Democratic Party candidate.

Political Party	Number of registered voters (March 1, 2026)	Percent
Republican	3,270	75.91%
Independent	529	12.28%
Democratic	469	10.89%
Libertarian	26	0.60%
Legal Marijuana Now	14	0.32%
Total	4,308	100.00%

United States presidential election results for Antelope County, Nebraska
Year	Republican		Democratic		Third party(ies)	
Year	No.	%	No.	%	No.	%
1900	1,342	48.75%	1,356	49.26%	55	2.00%
1904	1,813	64.73%	353	12.60%	635	22.67%
1908	1,658	51.68%	1,455	45.36%	95	2.96%
1912	877	27.90%	1,238	39.39%	1,028	32.71%
1916	1,495	43.33%	1,881	54.52%	74	2.14%
1920	3,322	70.91%	1,154	24.63%	209	4.46%
1924	2,598	47.12%	1,150	20.86%	1,765	32.02%
1928	4,277	67.80%	2,016	31.96%	15	0.24%
1932	2,270	35.38%	4,053	63.17%	93	1.45%
1936	3,304	49.52%	3,165	47.44%	203	3.04%
1940	4,331	66.77%	2,155	33.23%	0	0.00%
1944	3,888	70.61%	1,618	29.39%	0	0.00%
1948	2,868	60.49%	1,873	39.51%	0	0.00%
1952	4,377	80.39%	1,068	19.61%	0	0.00%
1956	3,607	73.00%	1,334	27.00%	0	0.00%
1960	3,617	71.10%	1,470	28.90%	0	0.00%
1964	2,566	56.15%	2,004	43.85%	0	0.00%
1968	2,805	68.13%	952	23.12%	360	8.74%
1972	3,228	79.14%	851	20.86%	0	0.00%
1976	2,488	64.01%	1,325	34.09%	74	1.90%
1980	3,192	78.68%	659	16.24%	206	5.08%
1984	3,222	81.80%	697	17.69%	20	0.51%
1988	2,626	73.78%	933	26.22%	0	0.00%
1992	1,979	52.41%	650	17.21%	1,147	30.38%
1996	2,005	59.50%	884	26.23%	481	14.27%
2000	2,562	76.07%	678	20.13%	128	3.80%
2004	2,761	80.64%	613	17.90%	50	1.46%
2008	2,383	74.82%	757	23.77%	45	1.41%
2012	2,596	80.32%	571	17.67%	65	2.01%
2016	2,732	83.27%	383	11.67%	166	5.06%
2020	3,093	86.23%	452	12.60%	42	1.17%
2024	3,032	87.68%	396	11.45%	30	0.87%

== See also ==
- National Register of Historic Places listings in Antelope County, Nebraska
