= Neligh, Nebraska =

City in and county seat of Antelope County, Nebraska, U.S.

- City
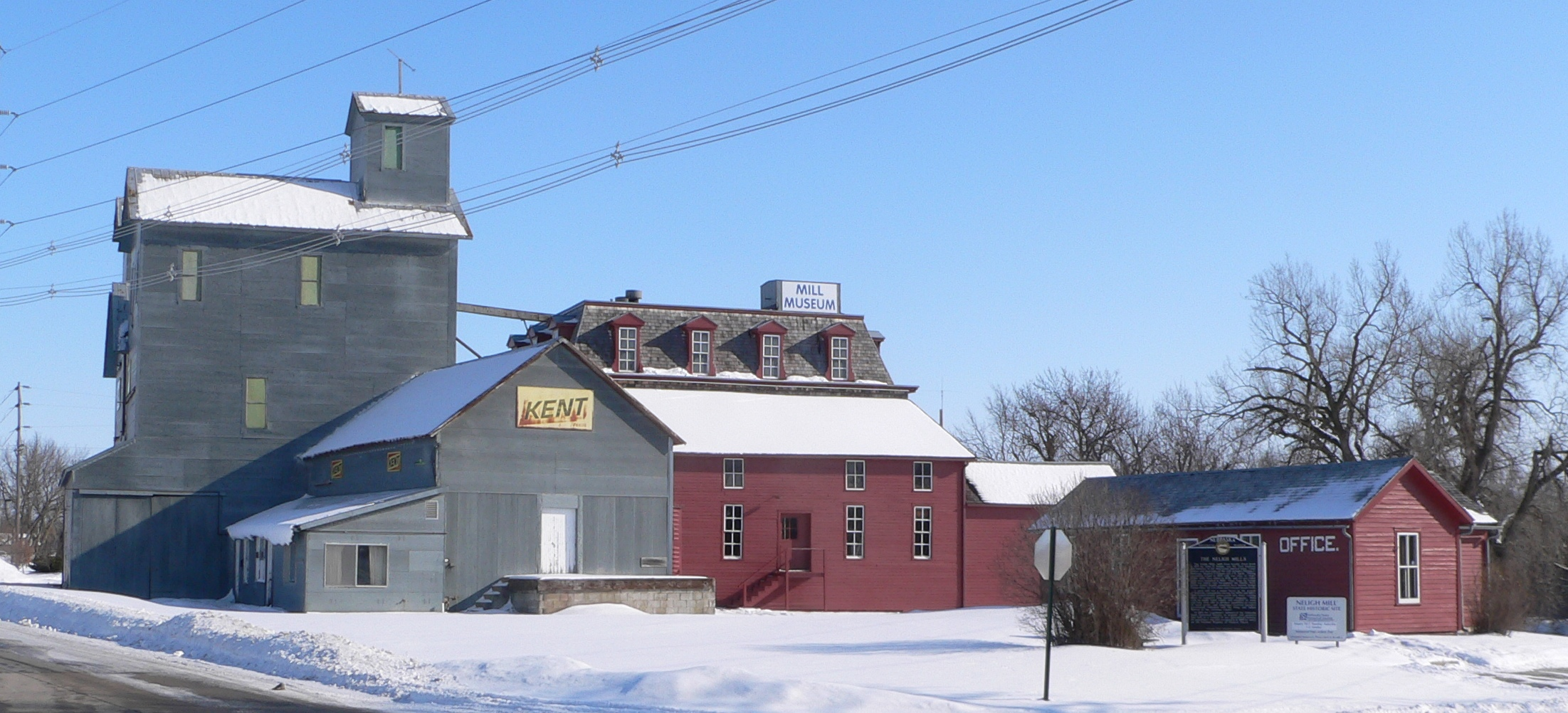
- Neligh Mill on bank of Elkhorn River (2010)

- Location within Antelope County and Nebraska
- Coordinates: 42°07′44″N 98°01′47″W
- Country: United States
- State: Nebraska
- County: Antelope

Government
  - Mayor: Joe Hartz City Council: Ted Hughes; Leonard Miller; Tyler Pedersen; Stephanie Lundgren

Area
  - Total: 1.47 sq mi (3.82 km^{2})
  - Land: 1.46 sq mi (3.79 km^{2})
  - Water: 0.012 sq mi (0.03 km^{2})
- Elevation: 1,755 ft (535 m)

Population (2020)
  - Total: 1,536
  - Density: 1,050.8/sq mi (405.72/km^{2})
- Time zone: UTC-6 (Central (CST))
  - Summer (DST): UTC-5 (CDT)
- ZIP code: 68756
- Area code: 402
- FIPS code: 31-33775
- GNIS feature ID: 838151
- Website: neligh.org

Neligh /ˈniːliː/ NEE-lee is a city in and the county seat of Antelope County, Nebraska, United States. As of the 2020 census, Neligh had a population of 1,536.

== History ==
In 1872, John D. Neligh and a few of his friends took a trip up the Elkhorn River from West Point, Nebraska. Neligh took note of the scenic landscape and thought it would be the ideal setting for a town and the county seat. He immediately left for Omaha to buy 520 acres for the town site. Misunderstanding the prime land he was selling, Omaha banker Herman Kountze sold the land required to develop Neligh. He was apparently not aware it would make the ideal county seat, which Neligh eventually became. The records were moved to Neligh on January 1, 1884. Neligh was platted in 1873 by John Neligh and others, and named for him.

=== White Buffalo Girl ===
In May 1877, the Ponca tribe was forced to leave their homeland on the Niobrara River and move to Indian Territory in present-day Oklahoma. The rigors of the journey and resettlement led to the death of one-third of the tribe's population. During the migration, an 18-month-old girl named White Buffalo Girl died near Neligh. Her father, Black Elk, asked the townspeople "to respect the grave of my child just as they do the graves of their own dead". She was buried in Laurel Hill Cemetery in Neligh, and her grave tended by the residents; in 1960, owing to the deterioration of the monument, the marker was set on a new foundation.

=== Neligh Mill ===
Shortly after founding the town, John D. Neligh began building the Neligh Mill in the southern part of town. The original two-story mill was built with bricks made by John J. Crawford, using local clay. Currently, the Neligh Mill is a Nebraska State Historical site.

== Geography ==
According to the United States Census Bureau, the city has a total area of 1.11 square miles (2.87 km^{2}), of which 1.10 square miles (2.85 km^{2}) is land and 0.01 square miles (0.03 km^{2}) is water.

=== Climate ===
This climatic region is typified by large seasonal temperature differences, with warm to hot (and often humid) summers and cold (sometimes severely cold) winters. According to the Köppen Climate Classification system, Neligh has a humid continental climate, abbreviated "Dfa" on climate maps.

Climate data for Neligh, Nebraska
| Month | Jan | Feb | Mar | Apr | May | Jun | Jul | Aug | Sep | Oct | Nov | Dec | Year |
|---|---|---|---|---|---|---|---|---|---|---|---|---|---|
| Mean daily maximum °C (°F) | −1 (31) | 2 (35) | 8 (47) | 16 (60) | 22 (72) | 27 (80) | 31 (87) | 29 (84) | 24 (76) | 17 (62) | 6 (43) | 0 (32) | 15 (59) |
| Mean daily minimum °C (°F) | −13 (9) | −11 (13) | −5 (23) | 1 (34) | 8 (46) | 14 (57) | 16 (61) | 15 (59) | 11 (51) | 3 (37) | −5 (23) | −12 (11) | 2 (35) |
| Average precipitation mm (inches) | 15 (0.6) | 18 (0.7) | 41 (1.6) | 61 (2.4) | 97 (3.8) | 100 (4) | 79 (3.1) | 76 (3) | 56 (2.2) | 43 (1.7) | 25 (1) | 18 (0.7) | 630 (24.9) |
| Average precipitation days | 4 | 4 | 6 | 8 | 10 | 10 | 8 | 8 | 7 | 6 | 4 | 4 | 79 |
Source: Weatherbase

== Demographics ==
Historical population
| Census | Pop. | Note | %± |
|---|---|---|---|
| 1880 | 326 | | — |
| 1890 | 1,209 | | 270.9% |
| 1900 | 1,135 | | −6.1% |
| 1910 | 1,566 | | 38.0% |
| 1920 | 1,724 | | 10.1% |
| 1930 | 1,649 | | −4.4% |
| 1940 | 1,796 | | 8.9% |
| 1950 | 1,822 | | 1.4% |
| 1960 | 1,776 | | −2.5% |
| 1970 | 1,764 | | −0.7% |
| 1980 | 1,893 | | 7.3% |
| 1990 | 1,742 | | −8.0% |
| 2000 | 1,651 | | −5.2% |
| 2010 | 1,599 | | −3.1% |
| 2020 | 1,536 | | −3.9% |
U.S. Decennial Census

=== 2010 census ===
As of the census of 2010, there were 1,599 people, 707 households, and 407 families residing in the city. The population density was 1,453.6 inhabitants per square mile (561.2/km^{2}). There were 781 housing units at an average density of 710.0 per square mile (274.1/km^{2}). The racial makeup of the city was 97.2% White, 0.3% African American, 0.3% Native American, 0.4% Asian, 1.2% from other races, and 0.8% from two or more races. Hispanic or Latino people of any race were 4.2% of the population.

There were 707 households, of which 24.6% had children under the age of 18 living with them, 47.0% were married couples living together, 7.4% had a female householder with no husband present, 3.3% had a male householder with no wife present, and 42.4% were non-families. 39.5% of all households were made up of individuals, and 21.2% had someone living alone who was 65 years of age or older. The average household size was 2.17 and the average family size was 2.93.

The median age in the city was 47.1 years. 23% of residents were under the age of 18; 5.3% were between the ages of 18 and 24; 19.1% were from 25 to 44; 28.6% were from 45 to 64; and 24% were 65 years of age or older. The gender makeup of the city was 47.8% male and 52.2% female.

=== 2000 census ===
As of the census of 2000, there were 1,651 people, 697 households, and 443 families residing in the city. The population density was 1,731.7 inhabitants per square mile (668.6/km^{2}). There were 771 housing units at an average density of 808.7 per square mile (312.2/km^{2}). The racial makeup of the city was 98.97% White, 0.55% from other races, and 0.48% from two or more races. Hispanic or Latino people of any race were 1.45% of the population.

There were 697 households, out of which 28.7% had children under the age of 18 living with them, 53.5% were married couples living together, 8.0% had a female householder with no husband present, and 36.3% were non-families. 34.1% of all households were made up of individuals, and 21.1% had someone living alone who was 65 years of age or older. The average household size was 2.26 and the average family size was 2.89.

In the city, the population was spread out, with 24.0% under the age of 18, 5.9% from 18 to 24, 22.2% from 25 to 44, 23.1% from 45 to 64, and 24.8% who were 65 years of age or older. The median age was 44 years. For every 100 females, there were 84.9 males. For every 100 females age 18 and over, there were 78.5 males.

As of 2000 the median income for a household in the city was $30,580, and the median income for a family was $39,750. Males had a median income of $29,261 versus $16,667 for females. The per capita income for the city was $17,888. About 10.6% of families and 14.2% of the population were below the poverty line, including 23.2% of those under age 18 and 10.1% of those age 65 or over.

== Media ==
There are two media groups in Neligh – the Antelope County News and Neligh News & Leader. Both are members of the Nebraska Press Association.

The Antelope County News was launched in January 2014 as online-based media from Pitzer Digital, LLC. The company purchased The Orchard News in February 2016, and expanded the content and doubled circulation as The Orchard News/Antelope County News, becoming the first newspaper in the county to publish in color. Besides print and online forms, the Antelope County News is also available on radio station WJAG and on television with partner News Channel Nebraska.

The Neligh News & Leader serves all of Antelope County and has a circulation of more than 1,600.

== Notable people ==
- John DeCamp (1941–2017), politician and author of The Franklin Cover-up
- Robert A. Harper (1862–1946), botanist who researched the cytology and development of fungi, slime molds, and plants; he taught Greek and Latin at Gates College in Neligh from 1886 to 1888
- Frank Hughes (1881–1942), sport shooter
- Josephine Roche (1886–1976), industrialist, activist, and politician; Assistant Secretary of the Treasury (1934–1937)

== See also ==
- List of municipalities in Nebraska
