= Hathoway Slough =

Stream in Nebraska, USA

Hathoway Slough Tributary to Big Springs Creek
- Location of Hathoway Slough mouth Hathoway Slough (the United States)

Location
- Country: United States
- State: Nebraska
- County: Antelope

Physical characteristics
- Source: Elkhorn River divide
  - location: about 1 mile east of Orchard, Nebraska
  - coordinates: 42°20′22.02″N 098°11′52.26″W
  - elevation: 1,978 ft (603 m)
- Mouth: Big Springs Creek (South Branch Verdigre Creek tributary)
  - location: about 6 miles north-northeast of Orchard, Nebraska
  - coordinates: 42°24′17.01″N 098°12′58.27″W
  - elevation: 1,680 ft (510 m)
- Length: 6.39 mi (10.28 km)
- Basin size: 7.54 square miles (19.5 km^{2})
- Discharge
  - location: Big Springs Creek (South Branch Verdigre Creek tributary)
  - average: 1.12 cu ft/s (0.032 m^{3}/s) at mouth with Big Springs Creek (South Branch Verdigre Creek tributary)

Basin features
- Progression: Big Springs Creek (South Branch Verdigre Creek tributary) → South Branch Verdigre Creek → Verdigre Creek → Niobrara River → Missouri River → Mississippi
- River system: Niobrara
- Bridges: 516th Avenue, 864th Road, 516th Avenue, 865th Road, 866th Road, 867th Road

Hathoway Slough is a 6.39 mi (10.28 km) long second-order tributary to Big Springs Creek (South Branch Verdigre Creek tributary) in Antelope County, Nebraska.

== Course ==
Hathoway Slough rises on the Elkhorn River divide about 1 mile east of Orchard, Nebraska in Antelope County and then flows northeast and northwest to join Big Springs Creek about six miles [CONVERT]north-northeast of Orchard, Nebraska.

== Watershed ==
Hathoway Slough drains 7.54 square miles (19.5 km^{2}) of area, receives about 26.3 in/year of precipitation, has a wetness index of 555.68, and is about 2.24% forested.

== See also ==
- List of rivers of Nebraska
