= Big Springs Creek (South Branch Verdigre Creek tributary) =

Stream in Nebraska, USA

Big Springs Creek Tributary to South Branch Verdigre Creek
- Location of Big Springs Creek mouth Big Springs Creek (South Branch Verdigre Creek tributary) (the United States)

Location
- Country: United States
- State: Nebraska
- County: Antelope

Physical characteristics
- Source: Elkhorn River divide
  - location: about 1.5 miles west of Orchard, Nebraska
  - coordinates: 42°18′55.02″N 098°17′10.27″W
  - elevation: 1,978 ft (603 m)
- Mouth: South Branch Verdigre Creek
  - location: about 5 miles north-northeast of Orchard, Nebraska
  - coordinates: 42°24′57.01″N 098°12′58.27″W
  - elevation: 1,654 ft (504 m)
- Length: 10.78 mi (17.35 km)
- Basin size: 30.98 square miles (80.2 km^{2})
- Discharge
  - location: South Branch Verdigre Creek
  - average: 3.85 cu ft/s (0.109 m^{3}/s) at mouth with South Branch Verdigre Creek

Basin features
- Progression: South Branch Verdigre Creek → Verdigre Creek → Niobrara River → Missouri River → Mississippi
- River system: Niobrara
- Tributaries
  - right: Hathoway Slough
- Bridges: US 20, 864th Road, 865th Road, 511th Avenue, 866th Road, 512th Avenue, 513th Avenue, 514th Avenue

Big Springs Creek is a 10.78 mi (17.35 km) long third-order tributary to South Branch Verdigre Creek in Antelope County, Nebraska.

== Course ==
Big Springs Creek rises on the Elkhorn River divide about 1.5 miles [CONVERT] west of Orchard, Nebraska in Antelope County and then flows north and northeast to join South Branch Verdigre Creek about 5 miles [CONVERT] north-northeast of Orchard, Nebraska.

== Watershed ==
Big Springs Creek drains 30.98 square miles (80.2 km^{2}) of area, receives about 26.1 in/year [CONVERT] of precipitation, has a wetness index of 539.52, and is about 2.32% forested.

== See also ==
- List of rivers of Nebraska
