= South Branch Verdigre Creek =

Stream in Nebraska, USA

South Branch Verdigre Creek Tributary to Verdigre Creek
- Location of South Branch Verdigre Creek mouth South Branch Verdigre Creek (the United States)

Location
- Country: United States
- State: Nebraska
- County: Knox; Antelope

Physical characteristics
- Source: Elkhorn River divide
  - location: about 3 miles southeast of Page, Nebraska
  - coordinates: 42°21′28.02″N 098°20′50.28″W
  - elevation: 1,975 ft (602 m)
- Mouth: Verdigre Creek
  - location: about 8 miles east-southeast of Venus, Nebraska
  - coordinates: 42°26′16.01″N 098°08′26″W
  - elevation: 1,608 ft (490 m)
- Length: 19.18 mi (30.87 km)
- Basin size: 90.77 square miles (235.1 km^{2})
- Discharge
  - location: Verdigre Creek
  - average: 10.63 cu ft/s (0.301 m^{3}/s) at mouth with Verdigre Creek

Basin features
- Progression: Verdigre Creek → Niobrara River → Missouri River → Mississippi River → Gulf of Mexico
- River system: Niobrara
- Tributaries
  - right: Big Springs Creek

South Branch Verdigre Creek is a 19.18 mi (30.87 km)-long fourth-order tributary to Verdigre Creek in Knox County, Nebraska. This stream along with East Branch Verdigre Creek forms Verdigre Creek.

== Course ==
South Branch Verdigre Creek rises on the Elkhorn River divide about 3 miles southeast of Page, Nebraska and then flows generally northeast to join East Branch Verdigre Creek to form Verdigre Creek about 8 miles east-southeast of Venus, Nebraska.

== Watershed ==
South Branch Verdigre Creek drains 90.77 square miles (235.1 km^{2}) of area, receives about 26.1 in/year of precipitation, has a wetness index of 513.35, and is about 3.29% forested.

== See also ==
- List of rivers of Nebraska
