= Lamb Creek (Middle Branch Verdigre Creek tributary) =

Stream in Nebraska, USA

Lamb Creek Tributary to Middle Branch Verdigre Creek
- Location of Lamb Creek mouth Lamb Creek (Middle Branch Verdigre Creek tributary) (the United States)

Location
- Country: United States
- State: Nebraska
- County: Knox; Holt

Physical characteristics
- Source: North Branch Verdigre Creek divide
  - location: about 4 miles west of Walnut, Nebraska
  - coordinates: 42°32′53.60″N 098°19′47.00″W
  - elevation: 1,870 ft (570 m)
- Mouth: Middle Branch Verdigre Creek
  - location: about 3 miles southwest of Walnut, Nebraska
  - coordinates: 42°31′12.01″N 098°16′39.28″W
  - elevation: 1,614 ft (492 m)
- Length: 3.70 mi (5.95 km)
- Basin size: 3.83 square miles (9.9 km^{2})
- Discharge
  - location: Middle Branch Verdigre Creek
  - average: 0.53 cu ft/s (0.015 m^{3}/s) at mouth with Middle Branch Verdigre Creek

Basin features
- Progression: Middle Branch Verdigre Creek → Verdigre Creek → Niobrara River → Missouri River → Mississippi
- River system: Niobrara
- Bridges: 509th Avenue, 510th Avenue, 876th Road

Lamb Creek is a 3.70 mi (5.95 km) long first-order tributary to Middle Branch Verdigre Creek in Knox County, Nebraska.

== Course ==
Lamb Creek rises on the North Branch Verdigre Creek divide about 4 miles west of Walnut, Nebraska in Holt County and then flows southeast into Knox County to join Verdigre Creek about 3 miles southwest of Walnut, Nebraska.

== Watershed ==
Lamb Creek drains 3.83 square miles (9.9 km^{2}) of area, receives about 25.6 in/year of precipitation, has a wetness index of 529.41, and is about 0.54% forested.

== See also ==
- List of rivers of Nebraska
