= Allen D. Beemer =

Allen D. Beemer was born near Scranton, Pennsylvania, on December 19, 1842. He was a Civil War veteran of the 11th Pennsylvania Cavalry who, after the war, operated a hotel in Franklin, Pennsylvania, and a livery stable in Pennsylvania.

In 1869, he moved to West Point, Nebraska, the county seat of Cuming County. There, he engaged in the hotel business and in the buying and selling of grain and livestock. He held political offices in West Point and was sheriff of Cuming County from 1880 to 1884.

In 1885, Beemer led the effort to plat a village near the Rock Creek water stop along the Fremont, Elkhorn and Missouri Valley Railroad line. The village was named after a settlement on the opposite side of the Elkhorn River and several miles from the village site; that unincorporated settlement had been named Rock Creek after the stream on whose banks it was built. The plat was filed at the courthouse in West Point on May 26, 1885, in the names of A.D. Beemer and wife, George Canfield and wife, and K.C. Morehouse and wife.

Beemer worked to build a railway depot building and to construct a bridge across the Elkhorn to connect with the Rock Creek settlement and its important grain and flour mill. In 1886, a post office was established in the village he had platted; it was named the Beemer Post Office. Later that year, 54 residents petitioned the county seat to incorporate their settlement as the Village of Beemer. Beemer continued his efforts to develop his namesake village, founding a newspaper called the Beemer Times, and building a hotel, bank building and livery stable.

In February 1893, he accepted an appointment as Warden of the Nebraska State Penitentiary in Lincoln. He held that post from 1893 to 1895, and again from 1903 until his death on March 28, 1909. He is buried in the Wyuka Cemetery in Lincoln.
