= Middle Branch Verdigre Creek =

Stream in Nebraska, USA

Middle Branch Verdigre Creek Tributary to Verdigre Creek
- Location of Middle Branch Verdigre Creek mouth Middle Branch Verdigre Creek (the United States)

Location
- Country: United States
- State: Nebraska
- County: Knox; Holt

Physical characteristics
- Source: Elkhorn River divide
  - location: about 5 miles north-northeast of Page, Nebraska
  - coordinates: 42°26′35.01″N 098°23′28.29″W
  - elevation: 1,935 ft (590 m)
- Mouth: Verdigre Creek
  - location: about 3 miles southwest of Verdigre, Nebraska
  - coordinates: 42°32′34.01″N 098°05′28.26″W
  - elevation: 1,414 ft (431 m)
- Length: 25.28 mi (40.68 km)
- Basin size: 105.16 square miles (272.4 km^{2})
- Discharge
  - location: Verdigre Creek
  - average: 11.56 cu ft/s (0.327 m^{3}/s) at mouth with Verdigre Creek

Basin features
- Progression: Verdigre Creek → Niobrara River → Missouri River → Mississippi River → Gulf of Mexico
- River system: Niobrara
- Tributaries
  - left: Lamb Creek
- Waterbodies: Waterman Reservoir
- Bridges: 506th Avenue, 871st Road, 872nd Road, 509th Avenue, 874th Road, 876th Road, 513th Avenue, 514th Avenue, 515th Avenue, 878th Road, 518th Avenue

Middle Branch Verdigre Creek is a 25.28 mi (40.68 km) long fourth-order tributary to Verdigre Creek in Knox County, Nebraska.

== Variant names ==
According to the Geographic Names Information System, it has also been known historically as:

- Middle Branch Verdigree Creek

== Course ==
Middle Branch Verdigre Creek rises on the Elkhorn River divide about 5 miles north-northeast of Page, Nebraska in Holt County and then flows northeast into Knox County and east to join Verdigre Creek about 3 miles southwest of Verdigre, Nebraska.

== Watershed ==
Middle Branch Verdigre Creek drains 105.16 square miles (272.4 km^{2}) of area, receives about 25.68 in/year of precipitation, has a wetness index of 495.92, and is about 4.14% forested.

== See also ==
- List of rivers of Nebraska
