= Wisner, Nebraska =

- City
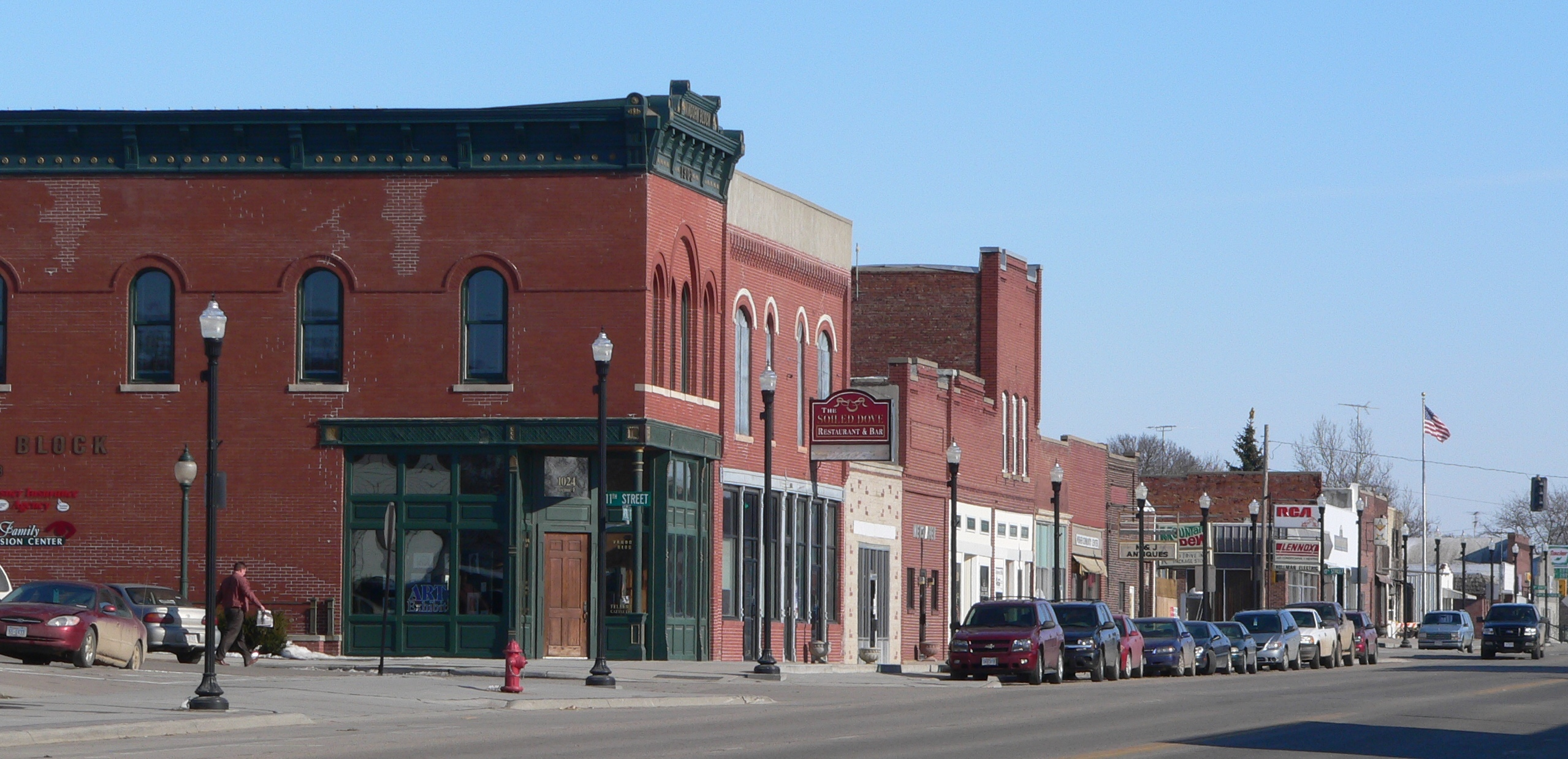
- Downtown Wisner: northeast side of Avenue E (US 275), March 2010

- Location of Wisner, Nebraska

- Location within Nebraska Location within the United States
- Coordinates: 41°59′21″N 96°54′53″W
- Country: United States
- State: Nebraska
- County: Cuming

Area
  - Total: 1.28 sq mi (3.31 km^{2})
  - Land: 1.25 sq mi (3.24 km^{2})
  - Water: 0.027 sq mi (0.07 km^{2})
- Elevation: 1,411 ft (430 m)

Population (2020)
  - Total: 1,239
  - Density: 990.8/sq mi (382.55/km^{2})
- Time zone: UTC-6 (Central (CST))
  - Summer (DST): UTC-5 (CDT)
- ZIP code: 68791
- Area code: 402
- FIPS code: 31-53450
- GNIS feature ID: 838335
- Website: www.ci.wisner.ne.us

Wisner is a city in northwestern Cuming County, Nebraska, United States. As of the 2020 census, Wisner had a population of 1,239.

== History ==
Wisner was platted in 1871 shortly before the railroad was extended to that point. It was named for Samuel P. Wisner, a railroad official for the Sioux City & Pacific Railroad. By the 1970s, the future of railroad transportation service came into question. The Chicago & North Western was running fewer trains through town. Train traffic volumes continued to decline as the decade progressed. Train service ultimately ended in 1982, after flooding damaged many sections of the track. Abandonment was applied for and granted the same year & tracks were removed in 1985.

== Geography ==
According to the United States Census Bureau, the city has a total area of 1.06 square miles (2.75 km^{2}), of which 1.03 square miles (2.67 km^{2}) is land and 0.03 square miles (0.08 km^{2}) is water.

== Demographics ==
Historical population
Census	Pop.	Note	%±
1880	282		—
1890	610		116.3%
1900	963		57.9%
1910	1,081		12.3%
1920	1,210		11.9%
1930	1,327		9.7%
1940	1,256		−5.4%
1950	1,233		−1.8%
1960	1,192		−3.3%
1970	1,315		10.3%
1980	1,335		1.5%
1990	1,253		−6.1%
2000	1,270		1.4%
2010	1,170		−7.9%
2020	1,239		5.9%
U.S. Decennial Census

=== 2010 census ===
As of the census of 2010, there were 1,170 people, 506 households, and 323 families residing in the city. The population density was 1,135.9 inhabitants per square mile (438.6/km^{2}). There were 579 housing units at an average density of 562.1 per square mile (217.0/km^{2}). The racial makeup of the city was 97.9% White, 0.1% African American, 0.1% Native American, 0.2% Asian, 0.2% from other races, and 1.6% from two or more races. Hispanic or Latino of any race were 1.4% of the population.

There were 506 households, of which 26.3% had children under the age of 18 living with them, 52.8% were married couples living together, 6.3% had a female householder with no husband present, 4.7% had a male householder with no wife present, and 36.2% were non-families. 33.2% of all households were made up of individuals, and 16% had someone living alone who was 65 years of age or older. The average household size was 2.24 and the average family size was 2.82.

The median age in the city was 44.6 years. 22.1% of residents were under the age of 18; 7.1% were between the ages of 18 and 24; 21% were from 25 to 44; 25.5% were from 45 to 64; and 24.3% were 65 years of age or older. The gender makeup of the city was 48.3% male and 51.7% female.

=== 2000 census ===
As of the census of 2000, there were 1,270 people, 564 households, and 350 families residing in the city. The population density was 1,229.1 inhabitants per square mile (474.6/km^{2}). There were 598 housing units at an average density of 578.8 per square mile (223.5/km^{2}). The racial makeup of the city was 98.35% White, 0.39% African American, 0.16% Native American, 0.24% Asian, 0.16% from other races, and 0.71% from two or more races. Hispanic or Latino of any race were 0.55% of the population.

There were 564 households, out of which 25.9% had children under the age of 18 living with them, 53.0% were married couples living together, 6.6% had a female householder with no husband present, and 37.8% were non-families. 34.8% of all households were made up of individuals, and 19.9% had someone living alone who was 65 years of age or older. The average household size was 2.18 and the average family size was 2.80.

In the city, the population was spread out, with 22.1% under the age of 18, 9.1% from 18 to 24, 21.7% from 25 to 44, 19.9% from 45 to 64, and 27.1% who were 65 years of age or older. The median age was 43 years. For every 100 females, there were 93.6 males. For every 100 females age 18 and over, there were 90.6 males.

As of 2000 the median income for a household in the city was $32,188, and the median income for a family was $40,938. Males had a median income of $28,056 versus $18,869 for females. The per capita income for the city was $16,268. About 3.8% of families and 9.0% of the population were below the poverty line, including 15.3% of those under age 18 and 6.3% of those age 65 or over.

== Livestock industry ==
Wisner is known as the livestock center of Nebraska; their economic activities include farming, and cattle and hog feeding. There are approximately 130,000 cattle boarders feeding in Wisner over 15 feedlots at one time. Louis Dinklage, a pioneer of commercial cattle feeding, got his start in Wisner and funded many of Wisner's public attractions.

=== Louis Dinklage and Dinklage Co. ===
Louis Dinklage was inducted into the Cattle Feeders Hall of Fame in 2013. Dinklage is considered one of the pioneers of commercial cattle feeding. He started his operation with only 25 to 30 head of cattle, but by 1923 had expanded to 400 head of cattle. He originally had a goal of 1,000 head of cattle, but by the late 1930s he fed roughly 3,000 to 4,000 head of cattle with a shovel and a team of horses. By the 1960s, Dinklage had 65,000 head of cattle, which made him the largest private cattle-feed operator in the United States. Louis Dinklage influenced and mentored many of Nebraska's top cattle feeders and was instrumental in founding Dinklage Feedyards.

=== Herman Dinklage, Inc., and tornado devastation ===
Wisner and surrounding areas were hit by the 2014 Pilger, Nebraska, tornado family. Herman Dinklage, Inc., a farming company owned and operated by Jeff and David Dinklage, was completely leveled to the ground. Jeff Dinklage, a 4th generation farmer, and his family had operated the farm on this land for almost a century. The Dinklage barn, farm equipment, including a planter, combine, and bailer, and home were destroyed as well as nearly 300 cattle killed.

== Wisner landmarks ==
Dinklage Park—Originally known as "City Park", it was donated to the city by the railroad. Located next to the original Wisner high school building, it featured a large gazebo and was often the site for graduations and school activities. In 1960, a swimming pool was built on the site, and that pool was replaced in 1982 with a heated, Olympic-sized pool courtesy of contributions by Wisner cattleman Louis Dinklage. The park was renamed in honor of Louis and his wife Abby Faye in 1982.

Dutch Hollow—Formerly a wooded valley at the base of Nye Hill, it became one of the earliest settled parts of Wisner, and many of its oldest houses can be found here. Ninth Street in Wisner directly runs the route that Dutch Hollow ran, and this street is still referred to as "Dutch Hollow" by residents.

Elkhorn River—Wisner is located directly on the border of this tributary of the Platte River, and it has been the source of several momentous events, such as major floods in 1966 and 1994, as well as a barge accident that killed three children in 1888. Because the river runs at a southeast angle, the roads of Wisner run a similar path, and very few roads in Wisner actually run truly north, south, east or west, but at a severely altered angle. In June 2010 floodwaters washed away the approach to the bridge, inconveniencing local travel and commerce.

Kane's Lake—A lake located directly south of the Elkhorn River, and the lake for which the unincorporated "Lakeview" (Wisner's original name) was named.

Land of Nod—This was an amusement park located just north of today's River Park, from 1917–1940. Founded by Wisner businessman Andy Peterson, it featured livestock show barns, a dance hall and an ice skating rink and was the site of Wisner's first baseball diamond. It was an ambitious project that ultimately failed (mostly due to the development of the nearby City Park). Only the park's brick pillared entry and Peterson's home remains standing.

Nye Hill—The hill upon which a major portion of the city was built, and it was named for the veterinarian who built his home directly upon it, and who owned the majority of the surrounding property. His home and the barn that he used for his practice still remain today.

River Park—Also called "Community Park" and perched directly by the Elkhorn River, this was built on land purchased by the city of Wisner in 1927. Over the years it has been the site of community baseball games (including several state tournaments), high school football (1933–1968), as well as snowmobile and motocross racing. Most recently, two fields for softball and youth baseball have been added (the softball fields have both served as the home field for the Wisner-Pilger High School softball team since the school started playing the sport in 2007), as well as a tractor pull arena for the annual "Thunder By The River" competition. It also features a rodeo arena and show barns for livestock shows, and has been the site for countless community concerts and activities.

Rock Creek—The primary tributary of the Elkhorn River in the region, located south of Wisner. It was the site of an unincorporated collection of German farmers in the late 19th century who felt shunned by area communities, particularly Wisner and Beemer, Nebraska. The farmers formed a baseball team that became well known throughout Nebraska and Iowa, and was known for drawing large crowds to its games. The "Rock Creek Tigers" played until 1952, when fielding a team became too expensive, and its remaining players began playing for Wisner and the West Point, Nebraska Bombers.

West Field—A pasture owned by the West family, where Wisner High first played football through 1930. The Wisner Auditorium, the community tennis courts and the Wisner volunteer fire department are now located on this property.

"The Blacktop"—An asphalt-paved two-lane road leading south of Wisner, crossing the Elkhorn River. The road was paved in 1964, as the newly constructed Elkhorn River Bridge made it the only route into Wisner from the south. Its true name is "6th Road" (named in 1995 when postal routes were re-defined), but residents south of Wisner (including the Rock Creek community, which lies directly on its route) refer to it as "The Blacktop", after a regional nickname for its asphalt surface. The road connects U.S. Highway 275 Highway to Nebraska Highway 32, which has made it well known as a significant shortcut to Lincoln, Nebraska for area travelers.

U.S. Route 275—Known as "Highway 275", it runs directly through Wisner, forming Wisner's main street and business district. Plans to divert Highway 275 to routes north of town (as part of a four lane expressway project) have been continually discussed, with local businesses hoping for a portion of the highway's traffic to continue to run through Wisner.

== Notable people ==
- Warren Alfson – 1940 All-American guard at Nebraska; NFL player, Brooklyn Dodgers (NFL), 1941
- Lewis H. Brown - Nebraska quarterback from 1930 to 1931
- Dale M. Hansen – Medal of Honor recipient, and namesake of the Camp Hansen USMC base on the Japanese island of Okinawa
- Virginia Huston - Hollywood actress featured in film Out of the Past (sometimes known as "Virginia Houston")
- Jim Kane - high school sports coach
- John Henry Kyl - Iowa Congressional Representative
- Jerry LaNoue – 1936 All-MVIAA halfback at Nebraska
- Frank Merriam – former Wisner school superintendent who became governor of California

== See also ==
- List of cities in Nebraska
