= Cottonwood Creek (Verdigre Creek tributary) =

Stream in Nebraska, USA

Cottonwood Creek Tributary to Verdigre Creek
- Location of Cottonwood Creek mouth Cottonwood Creek (Verdigre Creek tributary) (the United States)

Location
- Country: United States
- State: Nebraska
- County: Knox; Antelope

Physical characteristics
- Source: East Branch Verdigre Creek divide
  - location: about 3 miles northeast of Royal, Nebraska
  - coordinates: 42°21′33.02″N 098°05′5.25″W
  - elevation: 1,840 ft (560 m)
- Mouth: Verdigre Creek
  - location: about 5 miles east of Venus, Nebraska
  - coordinates: 42°26′56.01″N 098°07′44.26″W
  - elevation: 1,539 ft (469 m)
- Length: 7.37 mi (11.86 km)
- Basin size: 10.29 square miles (26.7 km^{2})
- Discharge
  - location: Verdigre Creek
  - average: 2.14 cu ft/s (0.061 m^{3}/s) at mouth with Verdigre Creek

Basin features
- Progression: Verdigre Creek → Niobrara River → Missouri River → Mississippi River → Gulf of Mexico
- River system: Niobrara
- Bridges: 866th Road, 868th Road

Cottonwood Creek is a 7.37 mi (11.86 km) long second-order tributary to Verdigre Creek in Knox County, Nebraska.

== Course ==
Cottonwood Creek rises on the East Branch Verdigre Creek divide about 3 miles northeast of Royal, Nebraska and then flows generally north-northwest to join Verdigre Creek about 5 miles east of Venus, Nebraska.

== Watershed ==
Cottonwood Creek drains 10.23 square miles (26.5 km^{2}) of area, receives about 27.0 in/year of precipitation, has a wetness index of 538.56, and is about 1.31% forested.

== See also ==
- List of rivers of Nebraska
