= Lewis H. Brown (American football) =

American football player (born 1909)

No. 17 – Nebraska Cornhuskers
- Position: Quarterback

Personal information
- Born: 1909; Wisner, Nebraska

Career information
- College: Nebraska (1929–1931)

Lewis H. Brown (born 1909, died 1965) was a quarterback for the Nebraska Cornhuskers from 1929 to 1931, while playing for coach Dana X. Bible. Brown lettered in 1930 and 1931, and started at quarterback in 1931. That season, he led the Cornhuskers to an 8–2 record, and an undefeated Big Six record and conference title.

A native of Wisner, Nebraska, Brown wore jersey #17 throughout his Cornhusker career, and was the first of three Wisner High School graduates to star at Nebraska in the 1930s. His cousin, Jerry LaNoue, would follow Brown to Nebraska, where he would earn All Big Six honors at quarterback; in turn, it was LaNoue who encouraged fellow Wisner native Warren Alfson to become a Cornhusker football player. Alfson ultimately earned All-America recognition as a guard in 1940.

Like Alfson and LaNoue, Brown worked for some time in order to save enough money to attend Nebraska.

Brown had never played an organized game of football until joining the Cornhuskers, as Wisner High did not field a football team while he attended the school. Wisner briefly fielded a team following Brown's graduation, but they failed to achieve a winning season. Despite Brown's field success, Wisner High School soon dropped football again after his Cornhusker career was finished. However, Brown achieved significant success as a Wisner High basketball player—in fact, he was a starter on the Bulldogs' 1923 state champion team as an eighth grade student, despite not being old enough to legally play. So, he was the only Wisner student to letter five times in a varsity sport.

According to Cornhusker records, Brown also lettered in baseball for Nebraska in 1930 and 1931. Soon after graduating from UNL, Brown relocated to California, and was still a resident there according to Wisner High alumni records in 1960. Brown died as a result of an automobile accident on August 24, 1965.
