= East Branch Verdigre Creek =

Stream in Nebraska, USA

East Branch Verdigre Creek Tributary to Verdigre Creek
- Location of East Branch Verdigre Creek mouth East Branch Verdigre Creek (the United States)

Location
- Country: United States
- State: Nebraska
- County: Knox; Antelope

Physical characteristics
- Source: Elkhorn River divide
  - location: about 1.5 miles southeast of Royal, Nebraska
  - coordinates: 42°18′31.02″N 098°05′23.25″W
  - elevation: 1,860 ft (570 m)
- Mouth: Verdigre Creek
  - location: about 8 miles east-southeast of Venus, Nebraska
  - coordinates: 42°26′16.01″N 098°08′26″W
  - elevation: 1,608 ft (490 m)
- Length: 3.37 mi (5.42 km)
- Basin size: 55.13 square miles (142.8 km^{2})
- Discharge
  - location: Verdigre Creek
  - average: 8.17 cu ft/s (0.231 m^{3}/s) at mouth with Verdigre Creek

Basin features
- Progression: Verdigre Creek → Niobrara River → Missouri River → Mississippi River → Gulf of Mexico
- River system: Niobrara
- Tributaries
  - left: Hay Creek
- Waterbodies: Grove Lake

East Branch Verdigre Creek is a 3.37 mi (5.42 km)-long third-order tributary to Verdigre Creek in Knox County, Nebraska, United States. This stream along with South Branch Verdigre Creek forms Verdigre Creek.

== Course ==
East Branch Verdigre Creek rises on the Elkhorn River divide about 1.5 miles southeast of Royal, Nebraska and then flows north-northwest to join South Branch Verdigre Creek to form Verdigre Creek about 8 miles east-southeast of Venus, Nebraska.

== Watershed ==
East Branch Verdigre Creek drains 55.13 square miles (142.8 km^{2}) of area, receives about 26.2 in/year of precipitation, has a wetness index of 564.29, and is about 5.53% forested.

== See also ==
- List of rivers of Nebraska
