= Marian Price (Nebraska politician) =

American politician (born 1938)

Member of the Nebraska Legislature from the 26th district
- In office January 6, 1999 – January 3, 2007
- Preceded by: Don Wesely
- Succeeded by: Amanda McGill

Personal details
- Born: August 6, 1938 (age 88) Page, Nebraska
- Party: Republican
- Education: Nebraska Wesleyan University; Bryan Memorial School of Nursing
- Occupation: Retired nurse, restaurateur

Marian LaVonne Price (née Heiss, born August 6, 1938) is a Republican politician and registered nurse from Nebraska who served as a member of the Nebraska Legislature from 1999 to 2007. She is a Republican.

== Personal life ==
Price was born August 6, 1938, in Page, Nebraska, and graduated from Page High School in 1955. She attended Nebraska Wesleyan University from 1955 to 1956. During this time she became a member of Alpha Gamma Delta. Price graduated from Bryan Memorial Hospital school of nursing in 1959. She is a former member of the Lincoln Board of Education and the Lancaster County reorganization committee. She is a member of Bethany Christian Church, Bryan Memorial Hospital School of Nursing alumnae association, and board of directors of the Home Health Services for Independent Living Inc., as well as other organizations.

== State legislature ==
Price was elected in 1998 to represent the 26th Nebraska legislative district and reelected in 2002. She sat on the Appropriations and Nebraska Retirement Systems committees as well as the Committee on Committees and is the vice chairperson of the Legislative Performance Audit. Since Nebraska voters passed Initiative Measure 415 in 2001 limiting state senators to two terms after 2001, she was unable run for reelection.
