= Earnest Cary =

American classicist

- Born: 25 February 1879; Beemer, Nebraska
- Died: Unknown
- Scientific career
- Fields: Classics

Earnest Cary (born 25 February 1879) was an American classicist, historian, and translator of classical works.

== Early life ==
He was born on 25 February 1879 in Beemer, Nebraska.

== Education ==
He completed his bachelor's degree from Gates College in classics. He also received a AB and PhD from Harvard University.

His doctoral dissertation supervisor was John Williams White.

== Career ==
He has served as teacher of classics at Harvard University.

He has translated a number of classical works, most notably those of Dionysius of Halicarnassus and Cassius Dio.

He has frequently collaborated with Herbert Baldwin Foster.

== Selected works ==
His notable books include:

- Dio's Roman History (translated by Earnest Cary)
- Roman Antiquities by Dionysius of Halicarnassus (translated by Earnest Cary)

== See also ==
- Harvard University
- Dionysius of Halicarnassus
- Cassius Dio
