= Beemer Township, Cuming County, Nebraska =

Beemer Township
- Township
- Location in Cuming County
- Coordinates: 41°57′58″N 096°50′36″W
- Country: United States
- State: Nebraska
- County: Cuming

Area
  - Total: 35.66 sq mi (92.37 km^{2})
  - Land: 35.3 sq mi (91.3 km^{2})
  - Water: 0.41 sq mi (1.06 km^{2}) 1.15%
- Elevation: 1,440 ft (439 m)

Population (2020)
  - Total: 791
  - Density: 22.4/sq mi (8.66/km^{2})
- GNIS feature ID: 0837872

Beemer Township is one of sixteen townships in Cuming County, Nebraska, United States. The population was 791 at the 2020 census. A 2021 estimate placed the township's population at 811.

The Village of Beemer lies within the Township.

== See also ==
- County government in Nebraska
