= Merriman Creek (Verdigre Creek tributary) =

Stream in Nebraska, USA

Merriman Creek Tributary to Verdigre Creek
- Location of Merriman Creek mouth Merriman Creek (Verdigre Creek tributary) (the United States)

Location
- Country: United States
- State: Nebraska
- County: Knox; Antelope

Physical characteristics
- Source: Bazile Creek divide
  - location: about 5 miles southwest of Creighton, Nebraska
  - coordinates: 42°24′8.02″N 097°59′48.24″W
  - elevation: 1,782 ft (543 m)
- Mouth: Verdigre Creek
  - location: about 4 miles west-southwest of Winnetoon, Nebraska
  - coordinates: 42°29′42.01″N 098°06′36.26″W
  - elevation: 1,467 ft (447 m)
- Length: 11.11 mi (17.88 km)
- Basin size: 34.83 square miles (90.2 km^{2})
- Discharge
  - location: Verdigre Creek
  - average: 5.62 cu ft/s (0.159 m^{3}/s) at mouth with Verdigre Creek

Basin features
- Progression: Verdigre Creek → Niobrara River → Missouri River → Mississippi River → Gulf of Mexico
- River system: Niobrara
- Bridges: 868th Road, 525th Avenue, 869th Road, NE 14, 872 Road, 520 Avenue

Merriman Creek is a 11.11 mi (17.88 km) long second-order tributary to Verdigre Creek in Knox County, Nebraska.

== Course ==
Merriman Creek rises on the Bazile Creek divide about 5 miles southwest of Creighton, Nebraska in Antelope County and then flows northwest into Knox County to join Verdigre Creek about 4 miles west-southwest of Winnetoon, Nebraska.

== Watershed ==
Merriman Creek drains 34.27 square miles (88.8 km^{2}) of area, receives about 26.7 in/year of precipitation, has a wetness index of 519.83, and is about 2.51% forested.

== See also ==
- List of rivers of Nebraska
