= Rodney J. Clifton =

American mechanical engineer (1937–2026)

- Born: Rodney James Clifton; July 10, 1937; Orchard, Nebraska, U.S.
- Died: October 24, 2026 (aged 89); Rhode Island, U.S.
- Education: University of Nebraska–Lincoln; Carnegie Mellon University
- Occupation: Mechanical engineer
- Spouse: Merc Clifton

Rodney James Clifton (July 10, 1937 – October 24, 2026) was an American mechanical engineer.

== Early life and career ==
Clifton was born in Orchard, Nebraska, on July 10, 1937, the son of a banker. He attended the University of Nebraska–Lincoln, earning his BSc degree in civil engineering in 1959. He also attended Carnegie Mellon University, earning his PhD degree in 1964.

He served as a professor in the department of engineering at Brown University. During his years as a professor, he was named the Rush C. Hawkins University Professor, and was named a distinguished professor. In 1989, he was elected as a member of the National Academy of Engineering, and in 2005, he was elected as a member of the American Academy of Arts and Sciences.

== Personal life and death ==
Clifton was married to Merc, and they both lived in Barrington, Rhode Island. Their marriage lasted until Clifton's death in 2026.

Clifton died in Rhode Island on October 24, 2026, at the age of 89.
