= Dale M. Hansen =

United States Marine (1922–1945)

Dale Merlin Hansen
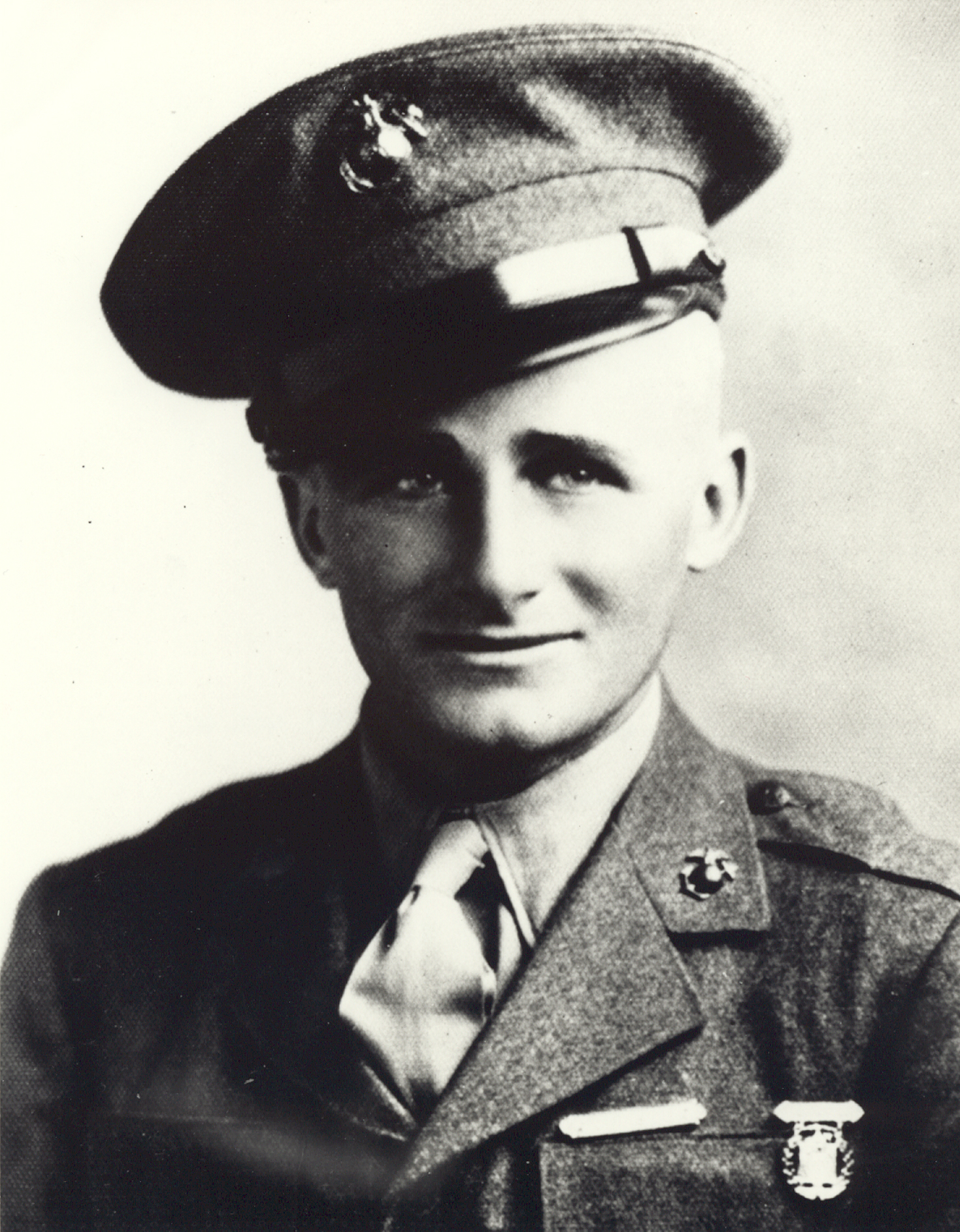
- Dale M. Hansen, Medal of Honor recipient
- Born: December 13, 1922; Wisner, Nebraska
- Died: May 11, 1945 (aged 22); Okinawa, Ryukyu Islands, Japanese Empire
- Burial place: initially the 1st Marine Division Cemetery Okinawa; Later reinterred in Wisner Cemetery in Wisner, Nebraska
- Military career
- Allegiance: United States of America
- Branch: United States Marine Corps
- Service years: 1944–1945
- Rank: Private
- Unit: 2nd Battalion 1st Marines
- Conflicts: World War II: Battle of Okinawa †
- Awards: Medal of Honor; Purple Heart
- Other work: Farmer

Private Dale Merlin Hansen (December 13, 1922 – May 11, 1945) was a United States Marine who earned the United States' highest military decoration — the Medal of Honor — for his outstanding heroism on May 7, 1945, in the fight for Hill 60 on Okinawa. He was killed by enemy sniper fire three days later.

== Early years ==
Dale Hansen was born in Wisner, Nebraska. While attending the schools of Cuming County, he helped out on the family farm, and after graduating from high school in Wisner in 1940, he worked full-time on the farm.

== Marine Corps service ==
Hansen was inducted into the Marine Corps Reserve on May 11, 1944. He completed recruit training at Marine Corps Recruit Depot San Diego, California, and was then assigned to the Infantry Training Battalion at Camp Pendleton, California, where he underwent four weeks of infantry indoctrination and two weeks of training with the Browning Automatic Rifle. With that weapon he turned in a score of 175 to become an Expert Automatic Rifleman.

Private Hansen sailed for the Pacific theater on November 12, 1944, with a replacement draft, and the following month, joined Company E, 2nd Battalion, 1st Marines, at Pavuvu in the Russell Islands. There, he underwent "bazooka" training before sailing with the 1st Marine Division for maneuvers at Banika Island and Guadalcanal in February 1945.

Late that March, after a few more days back at Pavuvu, the division left for Okinawa where Pvt Hansen landed with his unit on Easter Sunday, April 1, 1945. The action which brought him the Medal of Honor occurred in the battle for Hill 60 on the southern part of the island where his determination and total disregard of personal danger helped his unit take a well-defended enemy position.

Pvt Hansen was killed by a Japanese sniper on May 11, 1945, in the Wana-Dakeshi Ridge fighting.

The Medal of Honor was presented to Hansen's parents on May 30, 1946, by the officer in charge of the Midwestern Recruiting Division as part of Wisner's Memorial Day observance.

Private Hansen was initially buried in the 1st Marine Division Cemetery on Okinawa, but his remains were returned to the United States in 1948 for burial in Wisner Cemetery in Wisner, Nebraska.

== Medal of Honor Citation ==
The President of the United States takes pride in presenting the MEDAL OF HONOR posthumously to

PRIVATE DALE M. HANSEN
UNITED STATES MARINE CORPS RESERVE

for service as set forth in the following CITATION:

For conspicuous gallantry and intrepidity at the risk of his life above and beyond the call of duty while serving with Company E, Second Battalion, First Marines, First Marine Division, in action against enemy Japanese forces on Okinawa Shima in the Ryūkyū Chain, May 7, 1945. Cool and courageous in combat, Private Hansen unhesitatingly took the initiative during a critical stage of the action and, armed with a rocket launcher, crawled to an exposed position where he attacked and destroyed a strategically located hostile pillbox. With his weapon subsequently destroyed by enemy fire, he seized a rifle and continued his one-man assault. Reaching the crest of a ridge, he leaped across, opened fire on six Japanese and killed four before his rifle jammed. Attacked by the remaining two Japanese, he beat them off with the butt of his rifle and then climbed back to cover. Promptly returning with another weapon and a supply of grenades, he fearlessly advanced, destroyed a strong mortar position and annihilated eight more of the enemy. In the forefront of battle throughout this bitterly waged engagement, Private Hansen, by his indomitable determination, bold tactics and complete disregard of all personal danger, contributed essentially to the success of his company's mission and to the ultimate capture of this fiercely defended outpost of the Japanese Empire. His great personal valor in the face of extreme peril reflects the highest credit upon himself and the United States Naval Service.

/S/ HARRY S. TRUMAN

== Awards and decorations ==

1st row	Medal of Honor	Purple Heart	Combat Action Ribbon
2nd row	American Campaign Medal	Asiatic-Pacific Campaign Medal with one campaign star	World War II Victory Medal

== Posthumous honors ==
Camp Hansen, one of the ten Marine Corps camps on Okinawa comprising Marine Corps Base Camp Smedley D. Butler, is named in honor of Pvt. Hansen.

In 1967, a three-tiered display was commissioned by the Marine Corps and given to the city of Wisner, Nebraska, Hansen's hometown. It features an oil painting of Hansen wearing his Medal of Honor, a brass plaque recognizing his achievements, and a reproduction of the citation honoring Hansen. It is on display at Wisner-Pilger High School.

== See also ==
- List of Medal of Honor recipients
