= John Williams White =

American classicist

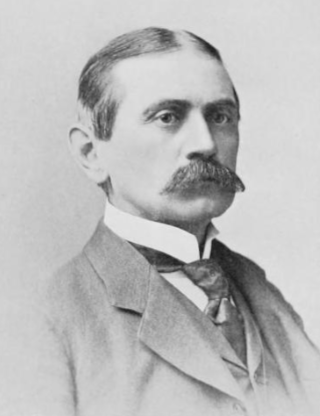
- Born: March 5, 1849; Cincinnati, Ohio, US
- Died: May 9, 1917 (aged 68); Cambridge, Massachusetts, US
- Education: Ohio Wesleyan University
- Spouse: Mary Alice Hillyer
- Scientific career
- Fields: Classics
- Workplaces: Harvard University

John Williams White (March 5, 1849 – May 9, 1917) was an American classicist, historian, and translator of classical works.

== Biography ==
He was born to the Reverend John Whitney and Anna Catharine in Cincinnati, Ohio on March 5, 1849.

He died on May 9, 1917 in Cambridge, Massachusetts.

== Education ==
He completed his bachelor's degree from Ohio Wesleyan University in 1868. He completed his master's degree in 1871 in Berlin. He completed his Ph.D. at Harvard University in 1877.

== Career ==
From 1884 to 1909, he served as professor of Greek at Harvard University. In 1913, he became the professor emeritus of Greek at Harvard University.

His notable doctoral students include James Loeb and Earnest Cary.

From 1881 to 1886 he was chairman of the managing committee of the American School at Athens, and in 1893-1894 held the annual professorship at the school. He was president of the Archaeological Institute from 1897 to 1903.

== Bibliography ==
He is the author of a number of notable books. These include:

- The Oedipus Tyrannus of Sophocles (1875)
- A Series of First Lessons in Greek: adapted to the revised and enlarged edition of Goodwin's Greek grammar, and designed as an introduction either to Goodwin's Greek reader, or to Goodwin and White's selections from Xenophon and Herodotus, or to the Anabasis of Xenophon (1877)
- An Introduction to the Rhythmic and Metric of the Classical Languages. To which are added the lyric parts of the Medea of Euripedes and the Antigone of Sophocles, with rhythmical schemes and commentary (1880)
- The Beginner's Greek Book (1892)
- An Illustrated Dictionary to Xenophon's Anabasis, with Groups of Words Etymologically Related (1892)
- The First Four Books of Xenophon's Anabasis (1894)

== See also ==
- Harvard University
- Earnest Cary
