= Jerry LaNoue =

American football player (1912–1983)

Gerald LaNoue (1912–1983) was a three-year starting quarterback for the Nebraska Cornhuskers, and earned All-MVIAA recognition in 1935, while playing for coach Dana X. Bible.

A native of Wisner, Nebraska, LaNoue wore jersey No. 11 throughout his career and was considered the fastest NU running back of his era, and several historians have made comparisons between him and Husker legend Johnny Rodgers because of his speed and deceptive moves on the field. LaNoue followed his cousin (and Wisner native), Lewis H. Brown (American football), also a starting quarterback for the Cornhuskers.

Despite LaNoue's presence, the Wisner High football team had a 5-15-1 record during his playing career. Not long after LaNoue's graduation, the school dropped football.

LaNoue lettered twice for the Cornhuskers, in 1933 and 1935. Due to a broken collarbone, he did not letter in 1934.

LaNoue is also linked to Nebraska football because it was through his connections that fellow Wisner native Warren Alfson became a Cornhusker football player. Alfson ultimately earned All-America recognition in 1940. Like Alfson, LaNoue delayed entering the University of Nebraska for several years, as he graduated from Wisner High in 1931, making him somewhat older than his teammates and opponents.
