= Jim Kane (coach) =

American baseball player

- Born: February 2, 1937; West Point, Nebraska, U.S.
- Died: January 28, 2003 (aged 65); Omaha, Nebraska, U.S.
- Occupation: Sports coach

Jim Kane (February 2, 1937 – January 28, 2003) was a Nebraska high school football, basketball, track and cross country coach, and was named the state’s “Coach of the Year” in 1983, and was posthumously named to the state’s High School Hall of Fame.

Jim “Killer” Kane was born in West Point, Nebraska; but he grew up in Wisner, Nebraska, where Jim became an athlete. He remains the Wisner High School all-time leader in points scored in basketball, and led the school’s baseball team to a state championship. In 1980, Nebraska sports historian Jerry Mathers named Kane as Wisner's best all around athlete ever.

After graduating in 1954, he attended the University of Nebraska and played baseball for the Cornhuskers. He earned All-Big Seven Conference recognition as a catcher in 1957 and 1958 before signing with the New York Yankees. Kane played three years in their farm system, but failed to make it to the major leagues because of the presence of Yogi Berra and Elston Howard on the parent squad.

Kane was part of a successful pitcher/catcher combination with childhood friend Charles Ziegenbein. They played together through grade school, high school (it was their battery combination that led Wisner High to its only state high school baseball championship) and through college at Nebraska (Ziegenbein would also earn all-Big Seven honors as a pitcher in 1957-58). Ziegenbein, too, was signed by the Yankees in 1958, but did not remain with the organization, opting to pursue a business career instead. Ziegenbein died of cancer in 1972.

Well known for his carousing ways, Kane was released by the Yankees’ Columbus farm team in 1960 after the parent club felt he was an unwanted influence on his roommates, including future American League rookie of the year Tom Tresh, Joe Pepitone and Tony Kubek. Kane never played professional baseball again.

With his professional career over, Kane returned to Nebraska and began teaching at Waterloo (NE) High School. After teaching there for two years, he was hired to create from scratch the athletic programs at St. John’s Seminary, a small parochial school outside of Elkhorn, Nebraska. Eventually, Kane would coach St. John’s (later renamed Mount Michael Benedictine Abbey and High School) to two state titles and three runner-up titles in basketball, while achieving a career record of 547-263. In football, Kane led the Knights to two state championships while establishing a career record of 197-97, while Kane coached two state champion teams in cross country and another in track.

In 1983, the Omaha World-Herald named Kane its “Coach of the Year”, after his Mount Michael football and basketball teams won state championships that school year.

Kane coached and taught at Mount Michael from 1964 to 2003, where he was known for his discipline and intensity. He was known for getting the most out of his players, who were usually outnumbered and overmatched physically. For instance, his 1990 state championship football team, which finished 11-1, started the year unranked and was picked to lose 8 times by the Omaha World Herald newspaper. He was diagnosed with cirrhosis of the liver, from which he died on January 28, 2003, at the age of 65. Kane's funeral was in Mount Michael's gymnasium, and he was buried in the monastery's cemetery.

Kane was named to the Nebraska High School Sports Hall of Fame in 2003.
