= Rock Creek (Nebraska) =

Stream in the U.S. state of Nebraska

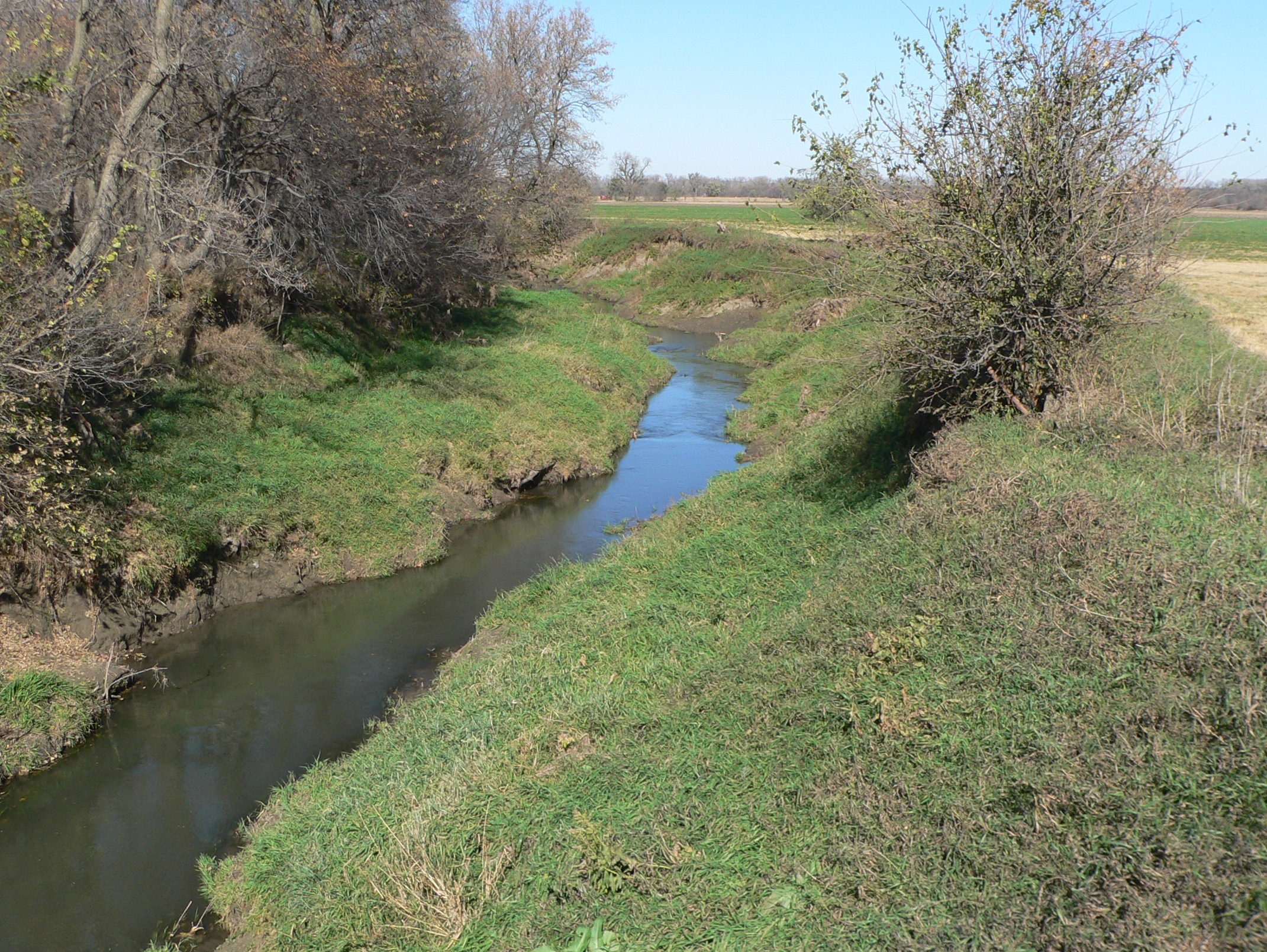
Rock Creek near Beemer

Rock Creek is a 19.1-mile-long (30.7 km) tributary of the Elkhorn River that flows south of Wisner and enters the Elkhorn one mile west of Beemer. The railway water stop and original plats where the village of Beemer is now located were named "Rock Creek" before Beemer was incorporated as a village in 1886.

The stream headwaters arise in Stanton County at 41°54′19″N 97°05′02″W at an elevation of approximately 1,650 ft (500 m). The stream flows west to enter the Elkhorn in Cuming County at 41°55′41″N 96°49′57″W and an elevation of 1,332 ft (406 m).

Rock Creek was so named from its rocky river bed.

== History of the community ==
It was the site of an unincorporated collection of German farmers in the late 1800s who felt shunned by area communities, particularly Wisner and Beemer, because they spoke very little English, and because they were farmers, laborers and field hands. Two churches were formed in this region to serve the overwhelming immigrant German Lutheran Rock Creek population—Zion Lutheran, and St. John's Lutheran.

=== Rock Creek Mill ===
Rock Creek Mill, or Lambrecht's combined saw and grist mill, driven by water power, was built in August 1865 by August Lambrecht. The mill stood about two miles northwest of the present-day Elkhorn River bridge, on the south side of the river and approximately 1000 feet southwest of the present-day 'Rock Creek Bridge' (41°54'53.91"N x 96°51'11.62"W). Lambrecht built an earth and brush dam to channel the water for the mill. Customers brought grain to the mill from as far away as the Platte River, some 200 miles, to be ground into flour. In 1891, Mr. Henry Lambrecht moved the flour and grinding mill to Beemer.

=== Rock Creek Railroad Station ===
When the Fremont, Elkhorn and Missouri Valley Railroad line was extended from West Point to Wisner in 1871, the water stop and telegraph station nearest to Rock Creek was named Rock Creek and used the call letters "R C" for telegraphs. The railroad company changed the station's name to Beemer in 1886. However, the rural farmland residents southwest of Beemer and south of Wisner continue to refer to themselves as Rock Creek, though they never incorporated as a village.

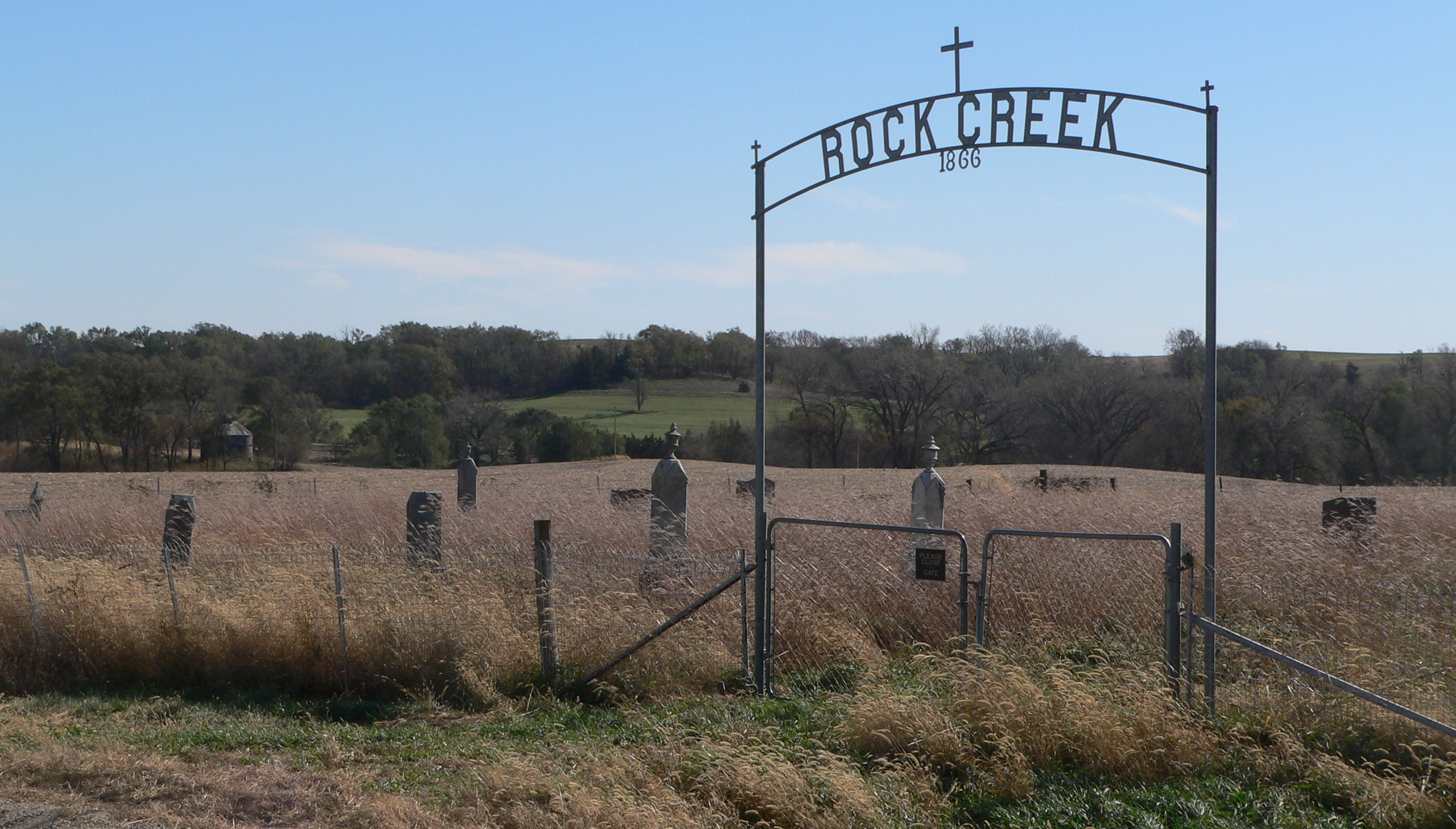
Rock Creek Cemetery

=== Rock Creek community today ===
Only two physical reminders of the Rock Creek era remains—one is a pioneer cemetery located southwest of Beemer that is known simply as "Rock Creek Cemetery". The other is the original Rock Creek post office, which is now part of a farmhouse near the St. John's cemetery.

== See also ==
- List of rivers of Nebraska
