= Warren Alfson =

American football player (1915–2001)

No. 33
- Positions: Guard, linebacker

Personal information
- Born: May 10, 1915; Wisner, Nebraska, U.S.
- Died: June 4, 2001 (aged 86); Wisner, Nebraska, U.S.
- Listed height: 6 ft 0 in (1.83 m)
- Listed weight: 198 lb (90 kg)

Career information
- High school: Wisner
- College: Nebraska (1937-1940)
- NFL draft: 1941: 16th round, 149th overall pick

Career history
- Brooklyn Dodgers (1941)

Awards and highlights
- First-team All-American (1940); Second-team All-American (1939); 2× First-team All-Big Six (1939, 1940)

Career NFL statistics
- Games played: 11
- Games started: 11
- Interceptions: 2
- Stats at Pro Football Reference

Warren Frank Alfson (May 10, 1915 – June 4, 2001) was an American professional football guard and linebacker for the Nebraska Cornhuskers, as well as the Brooklyn Dodgers of the National Football League (NFL).

== Early life ==
Alfson was born and raised in Wisner, Nebraska. He graduated from Wisner High School in 1933, where he was a halfback on the school's single wing football team.

== College career ==
After graduating from high school, Alfson worked and farmed for several years until earning enough money to attend the University of Nebraska, Class of 1941, where he was a member of the Chi Phi fraternity. When he attended school, he decided to try out for the Nebraska Cornhuskers football team (at the urging of fellow Wisner native Jerry LaNoue, a Cornhusker quarterback), but as a lineman.

After one year on the freshman squad, he asked the school's permission to continue practicing, but to not play, so that he could get himself into proper condition as well as to wait for the upperclassmen ahead of him to graduate. (Note: Contemporary reporting of this arrangement appears to be lacking. After the season, a February 1938 newspaper article mentioned that "Alfson was with the varsity last year at guard, but he didn't break into the lineup.") This made Alfson the first recorded redshirt in Cornhusker history, likely the first in collegiate history. The term "redshirting" originated because during that season he wore a red Nebraska jersey without a number.

Alfson's year of conditioning paid off well, as he returned to become a three-year starter for Nebraska. In the era of one-platoon football, he was a guard on offense, and a linebacker on defense. He wore jersey number 22 throughout his Cornhusker career. He was recognized with first-team All Big Six Conference honors in 1939 and 1940, second-team All-America honors in 1939, and he earned first-team All-America status in 1940. In the latter year, the Cornhuskers went 8–1 during the regular season under coach Biff Jones then played Stanford in the 1941 Rose Bowl.

== Professional career ==
In December 1940, Alfson was selected in the 16th round of the 1941 NFL draft by the Brooklyn Dodgers of the National Football League (NFL). In August 1941, he enlisted in the U.S. Navy in a special ceremony at the preseason Chicago College All-Star Game. Alfson played for the Dodgers during the 1941 NFL season. Then aged 26, he was nicknamed "Pops" and "Dad" by his younger teammates. Following the Attack on Pearl Harbor, his professional career was cut short as he began naval training in January 1942. That same month, he was engaged to his hometown girlfriend, Marjorie Horst; they were married in May 1942.

== Post-war ==
Alfson served in the Navy until November 1945, and was discharged at the rank of lieutenant. He then returned to his hometown and farmed, and also served on the Wisner school board as well as other organizations. He served as Wisner's acting mayor in 1965 upon the death of the incumbent. Alfson took great pride in his Cornhusker connections, and attended many Nebraska games. In 1975, he was inducted into the Nebraska Football Hall of Fame.

Alfson died at his home in Wisner in 2001. He had two daughters and one granddaughter. In 2005, Alfson was posthumously recognized as an honorable mention in the state of Nebraska's top athletes of all time, as selected by the Omaha World-Herald.

== Sources ==
- Babcock, Mike (1998). Go Big Red : The Ultimate Fan's Guide to Nebraska Cornhusker Football. New York: St. Martin's Griffin. ISBN 0-312-19457-9 – via Internet Archive.
