= Walnut, Nebraska =

Unincorporated community in Nebraska, U.S.

Coordinates: 42°32′58″N 98°12′32″W

Walnut Village is an unincorporated community in Knox County, Nebraska, United States.

== History ==
A post office was established at Walnut in 1894, and remained in operation until it was discontinued in 1956. Walnut was named from a grove of walnut trees near the town site.
