= Orchard, Nebraska =

Village in Nebraska, US

- Village
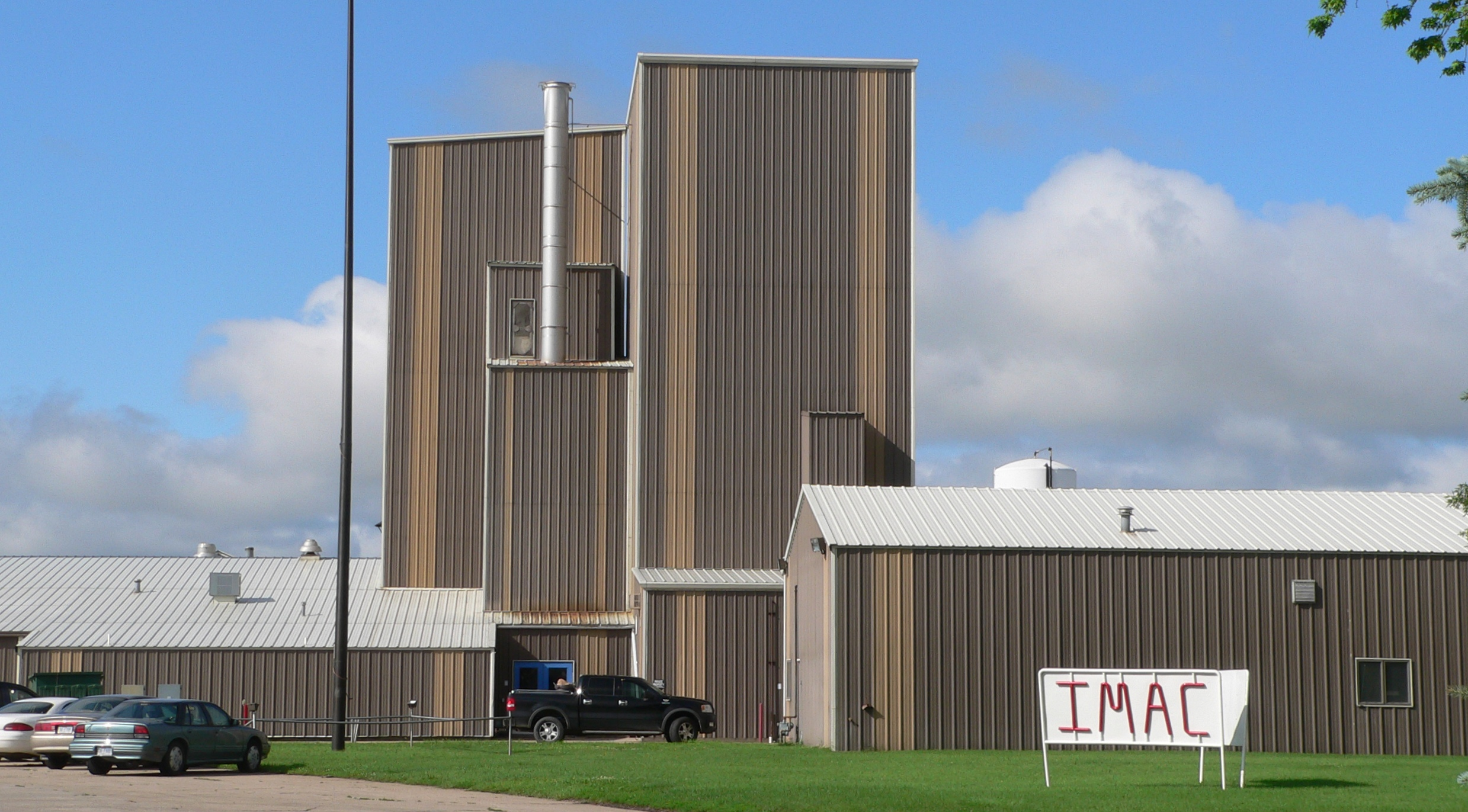
- IMAC plant in Orchard, June 2010. The plant produces anti-caking agents and starter media for cheese production.

- Location of Orchard, Nebraska
- Coordinates: 42°20′11″N 98°14′27″W
- Country: United States
- State: Nebraska
- County: Antelope
- Established: 1881

Area
  - Total: 0.39 sq mi (1.02 km^{2})
  - Land: 0.39 sq mi (1.02 km^{2})
  - Water: 0 sq mi (0.00 km^{2})
- Elevation: 1,942 ft (592 m)

Population (2020)
  - Total: 363
  - Density: 919.5/sq mi (355.04/km^{2})
- Time zone: UTC-6 (Central (CST))
  - Summer (DST): UTC-5 (CDT)
- ZIP code: 68764
- Area code: 402
- FIPS code: 31-37210
- GNIS feature ID: 2399581
- Website: orchardne.com

Orchard is a village in Antelope County, Nebraska, United States. As of the 2020 census, Orchard had a population of 363.

== History ==
Orchard was founded in 1880 when the railroad was extended to that point. It took its name from local apple orchards.

== Recreation ==
Approximately one block north of Orchard Public School, there is a collection of recreational facilities, including two baseball fields, a municipal pool, a playground area, tennis court, and batting cage.

== Education ==
Summerland Public Schools formed in 2020 after absorbing the Orchard school district.

Orchard was formerly in Nebraska Unified School District 1. Around 2007, the villages of Clearwater, Orchard, Royal and Verdigre became the Unified School District #1 and began sharing administration between them. Subsequent to this, in 2009, presumably due to a lack of funds and a lack of student participation on both ends, school rivals, the Orchard Orioles football team, and the Clearwater Cardinals football team, combined to form the O-C Cyclones. After the initial trial year, it was decided that all sports teams between the two schools would combine under the O-C Cyclones banner. The school systems have since combined to form the Clearwater-Orchard Public Schools.

Orchard is served by the Orchard Public Library.

== Geography ==
According to the United States Census Bureau, the village has a total area of 0.45 square miles (1.17 km^{2}), all land.

=== Climate ===
This climatic region is typified by large seasonal temperature differences, with warm to hot (and often humid) summers and cold (sometimes severely cold) winters. According to the Köppen Climate Classification system, Orchard has a humid continental climate, abbreviated "Dfa" on climate maps.

== Demographics ==
Historical population
Census	Pop.	Note	%±
1910	532		—
1920	444		−16.5%
1930	505		13.7%
1940	493		−2.4%
1950	458		−7.1%
1960	421		−8.1%
1970	467		10.9%
1980	482		3.2%
1990	439		−8.9%
2000	391		−10.9%
2010	379		−3.1%
2020	363		−4.2%
U.S. Decennial Census

=== 2010 census ===
As of the census of 2010, there were 379 people, 176 households, and 111 families living in the village. The population density was 842.2 inhabitants per square mile (325.2/km^{2}). There were 214 housing units at an average density of 475.6 per square mile (183.6/km^{2}). The racial makeup of the village was 98.2% White, 1.1% from other races, and 0.8% from two or more races. Hispanic or Latino of any race were 2.4% of the population.

There were 176 households, of which 21.6% had children under the age of 18 living with them, 54.5% were married couples living together, 5.7% had a female householder with no husband present, 2.8% had a male householder with no wife present, and 36.9% were non-families. 33.5% of all households were made up of individuals, and 18.2% had someone living alone who was 65 years of age or older. The average household size was 2.15 and the average family size was 2.71.

The median age in the village was 48.3 years. 20.3% of residents were under the age of 18; 8.7% were between the ages of 18 and 24; 16.3% were from 25 to 44; 29.8% were from 45 to 64; and 24.8% were 65 years of age or older. The gender makeup of the village was 50.7% male and 49.3% female.

=== 2000 census ===
As of the census of 2000, there were 391 people, 183 households, and 120 families living in the village. The population density was 937.1 inhabitants per square mile (361.8/km^{2}). There were 208 housing units at an average density of 498.5 per square mile (192.5/km^{2}). The racial makeup of the village was 100.00% White.

There were 183 households, out of which 20.8% had children under the age of 18 living with them, 57.4% were married couples living together, 7.7% had a female householder with no husband present, and 34.4% were non-families. 32.2% of all households were made up of individuals, and 21.3% had someone living alone who was 65 years of age or older. The average household size was 2.14 and the average family size was 2.68.

In the village, the population was spread out, with 20.2% under the age of 18, 6.1% from 18 to 24, 20.7% from 25 to 44, 29.4% from 45 to 64, and 23.5% who were 65 years of age or older. The median age was 47 years. For every 100 females there were 89.8 males. For every 100 females age 18 and over, there were 85.7 males.

As of 2000 the median income for a household in the village was $21,771, and the median income for a family was $29,063. Males had a median income of $27,813 versus $16,719 for females. The per capita income for the village was $13,075. About 11.7% of families and 16.3% of the population were below the poverty line, including 20.3% of those under age 18 and 20.2% of those age 65 or over.

== Media ==
The only media is the Antelope County News/Orchard News. The publication is now located in Neligh, Nebraska, but remains the legal newspaper for the community. It is owned by Orchard native Carrie Pitzer. While Orchard has no television or radio stations within the village itself, KGRD is licensed in Orchard, Nebraska. The station is a Christian radio station and broadcasts out of O'Neill, Nebraska.

== Notable people ==
- Rodney J. Clifton (1937–2026) – mechanical engineer

== See also ==
- List of municipalities in Nebraska
