= Page, Nebraska =

Village in Holt County, Nebraska, United States

- Village
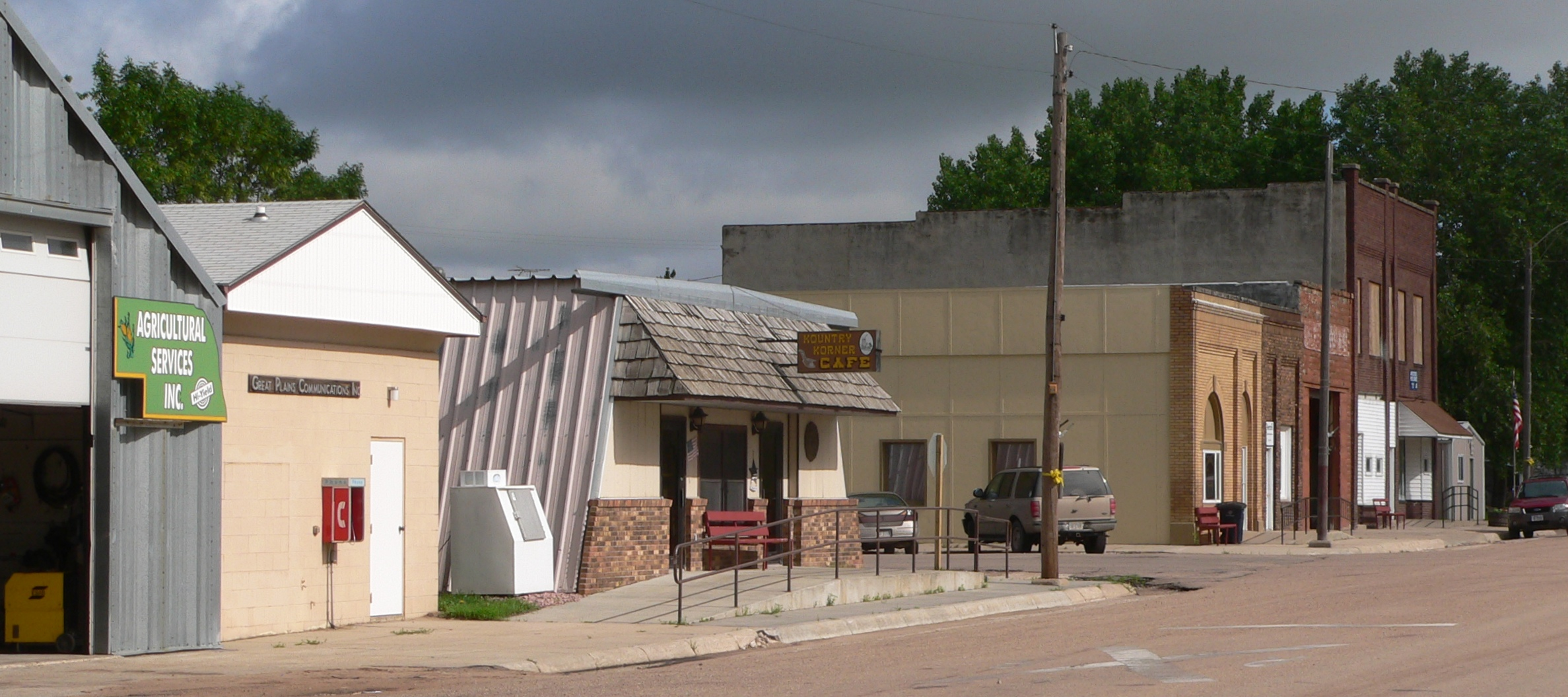
- Downtown Page

- Location of Page, Nebraska
- Coordinates: 42°24′00″N 98°25′04″W
- Country: United States
- State: Nebraska
- County: Holt

Area
  - Total: 0.24 sq mi (0.63 km^{2})
  - Land: 0.24 sq mi (0.63 km^{2})
  - Water: 0 sq mi (0.00 km^{2})
- Elevation: 1,955 ft (596 m)

Population (2020)
  - Total: 166
  - Density: 679.2/sq mi (262.23/km^{2})
- Time zone: UTC-6 (Central (CST))
  - Summer (DST): UTC-5 (CDT)
- ZIP code: 68766
- Area code: 402
- FIPS code: 31-38085
- GNIS feature ID: 2399607
- Website: www.pagene.us

Page is a village in Holt County, Nebraska, United States. As of the 2020 census, Page had a population of 166.

== History ==
Page got its start in the 1880s, following construction of the railroad through the territory. It was named for the Page family of pioneer settlers.

== Geography ==
According to the United States Census Bureau, the village has a total area of 0.24 square miles (0.62 km^{2}), all land.

== Demographics ==
Historical population
Census	Pop.	Note	%±
1920	271		—
1930	359		32.5%
1940	335		−6.7%
1950	275		−17.9%
1960	230		−16.4%
1970	177		−23.0%
1980	172		−2.8%
1990	191		11.0%
2000	157		−17.8%
2010	166		5.7%
2020	166		0.0%
U.S. Decennial Census

=== 2010 census ===
As of the census of 2010, there were 166 people, 75 households, and 49 families living in the village. The population density was 691.7 inhabitants per square mile (267.1/km^{2}). There were 92 housing units at an average density of 383.3 per square mile (148.0/km^{2}). The racial makeup of the village was 98.2% White, 1.2% Native American, and 0.6% Asian.

There were 75 households, of which 26.7% had children under the age of 18 living with them, 62.7% were married couples living together, 1.3% had a female householder with no husband present, 1.3% had a male householder with no wife present, and 34.7% were non-families. 32.0% of all households were made up of individuals, and 18.7% had someone living alone who was 65 years of age or older. The average household size was 2.21 and the average family size was 2.78.

The median age in the village was 43.5 years. 22.3% of residents were under the age of 18; 4.7% were between the ages of 18 and 24; 23.4% were from 25 to 44; 27% were from 45 to 64; and 22.3% were 65 years of age or older. The gender makeup of the village was 50.6% male and 49.4% female.

=== 2000 census ===
As of the census of 2000, there were 157 people, 79 households, and 42 families living in the village. The population density was 642.8 inhabitants per square mile (248.2/km^{2}). There were 95 housing units at an average density of 389.0 per square mile (150.2/km^{2}). The racial makeup of the village was 100.00% White.

There were 79 households, out of which 16.5% had children under the age of 18 living with them, 51.9% were married couples living together, 1.3% had a female householder with no husband present, and 46.8% were non-families. 45.6% of all households were made up of individuals, and 27.8% had someone living alone who was 65 years of age or older. The average household size was 1.99 and the average family size was 2.83.

In the village, the population was spread out, with 15.9% under the age of 18, 7.6% from 18 to 24, 24.8% from 25 to 44, 19.7% from 45 to 64, and 31.8% who were 65 years of age or older. The median age was 46 years. For every 100 females, there were 109.3 males. For every 100 females age 18 and over, there were 100.0 males.

As of 2000 the median income for a household in the village was $29,643, and the median income for a family was $48,750. Males had a median income of $38,125 versus $30,313 for females. The per capita income for the village was $18,286. About 13.0% of families and 18.5% of the population were below the poverty line, including 15.6% of those under the age of eighteen and 13.7% of those 65 or over.

== Notable person ==
- Marian Price - former member of the Nebraska Legislature

== See also ==
- List of municipalities in Nebraska
