= Verdigre Creek =

Stream in Nebraska, USA

Verdigre Creek Tributary to Niobrara River
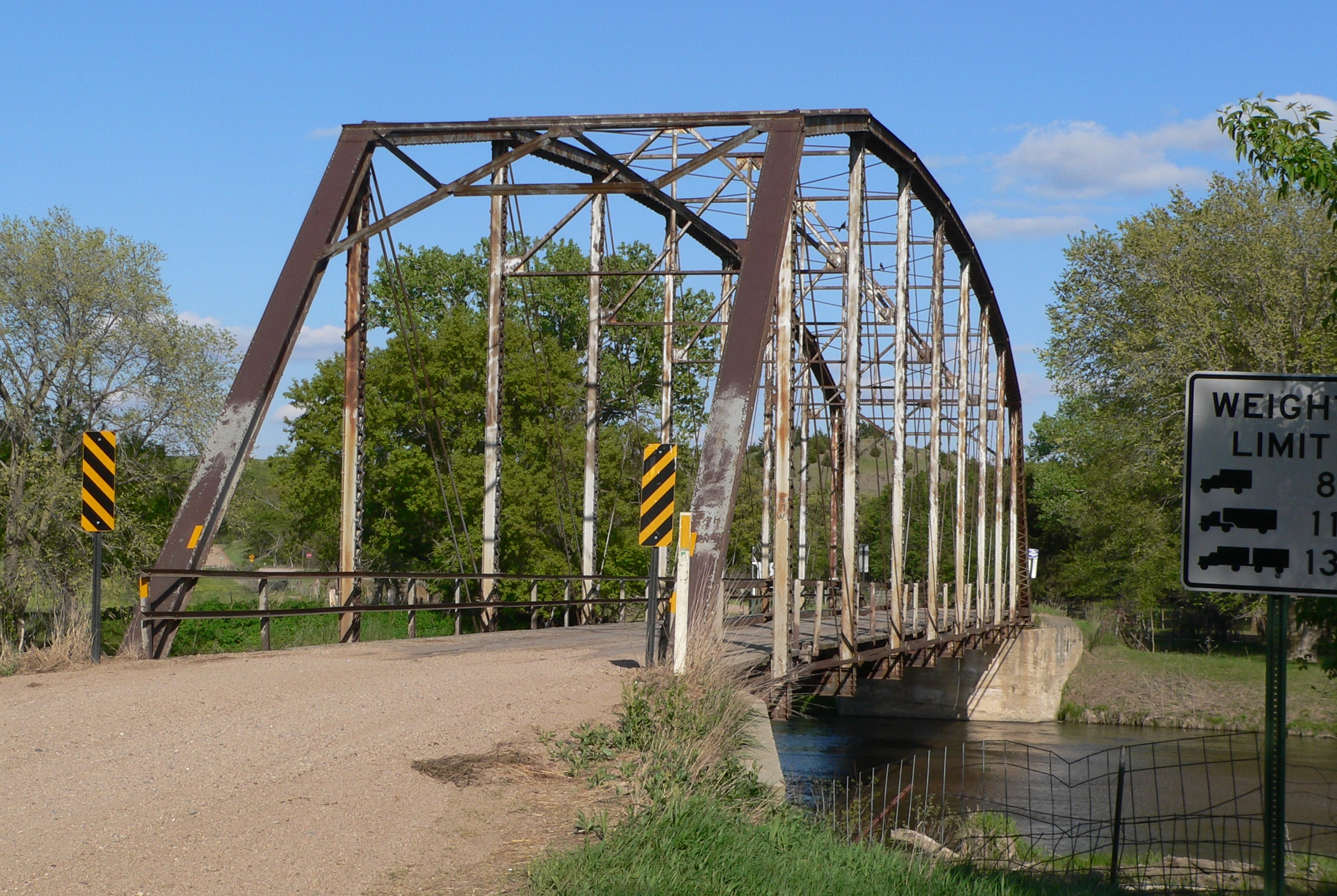
- Gross State Aid Bridge across Verdigre Creek in Knox County, NE

- Location of Verdigre Creek mouth Verdigre Creek (the United States)

Location
- Country: United States
- State: Nebraska
- County: Knox
- Village: Verdigre

Physical characteristics
- Source: confluence of South Branch Verdigre Creek and East Branch Verdigre Creek
  - location: about 8 miles east-southeast of Venus, Nebraska
  - coordinates: 42°26′16″N 98°03′23″W
  - elevation: 1,548 ft (472 m)
- Mouth: Niobrara River
  - location: about 4 miles south-southwest of Niobrara, Nebraska
  - coordinates: 42°42′0″N 98°03′23″W
  - elevation: 1,243 ft (379 m)
- Length: 23.75 mi (38.22 km)
- Basin size: 519.55 square miles (1,345.6 km^{2})
- Discharge
  - location: Niobrara River
  - average: 54.92 cu ft/s (1.555 m^{3}/s) at mouth with Niobrara River

Basin features
- Progression: Niobrara River → Missouri River → Mississippi River → Gulf of Mexico
- River system: Missouri River
- Tributaries
  - left: South Branch Verdigre Creek; Middle Branch Verdigre Creek; North Branch Verdigre Creek
  - right: East Branch Verdigre Creek; Cottonwood Creek; Merriman Creek
- Bridges: 872 Road; 873rd Road; 519 Avenue; 521 Road; Highway 54A; Main Street; 885 Road

National Wild and Scenic Rivers System
- Designated: May 24, 1991

Verdigre Creek is a stream in Knox and Antelope counties, in the U.S. state of Nebraska.

Verdigre is derived from the Spanish word verde meaning "green"; the name was applied to the stream for the green soil on its banks. Verdigre Creek was previously also known as Mauvaius River. The creek begins near 42°26′16″N 98°08′19″W where its tributaries, South Branch Verdigre Creek and East Branch Verdigre Creek converge on the mainstream, from there the creek flows through Verdigre, Nebraska and its mouth opens into the Niobrara River at 42°42′00″N 98°03′23″W about eight miles north of the town.

== See also ==
- List of rivers of Nebraska
