= Venus, Nebraska =

- Unincorporated Community
- Location within Nebraska Location within the United States
- Coordinates: 42.5°N 98.3°W
- Country: United States
- State: Nebraska
- County: Knox
- Named for: Roman Goddess Venus

Venus is an unincorporated community in Knox County, Nebraska, United States.

== History ==
A post office was established at Venus in 1880, and remained in operation until it was discontinued in 1959. The community was named for Venus, the Roman goddess of love.
