= Elkhorn River =

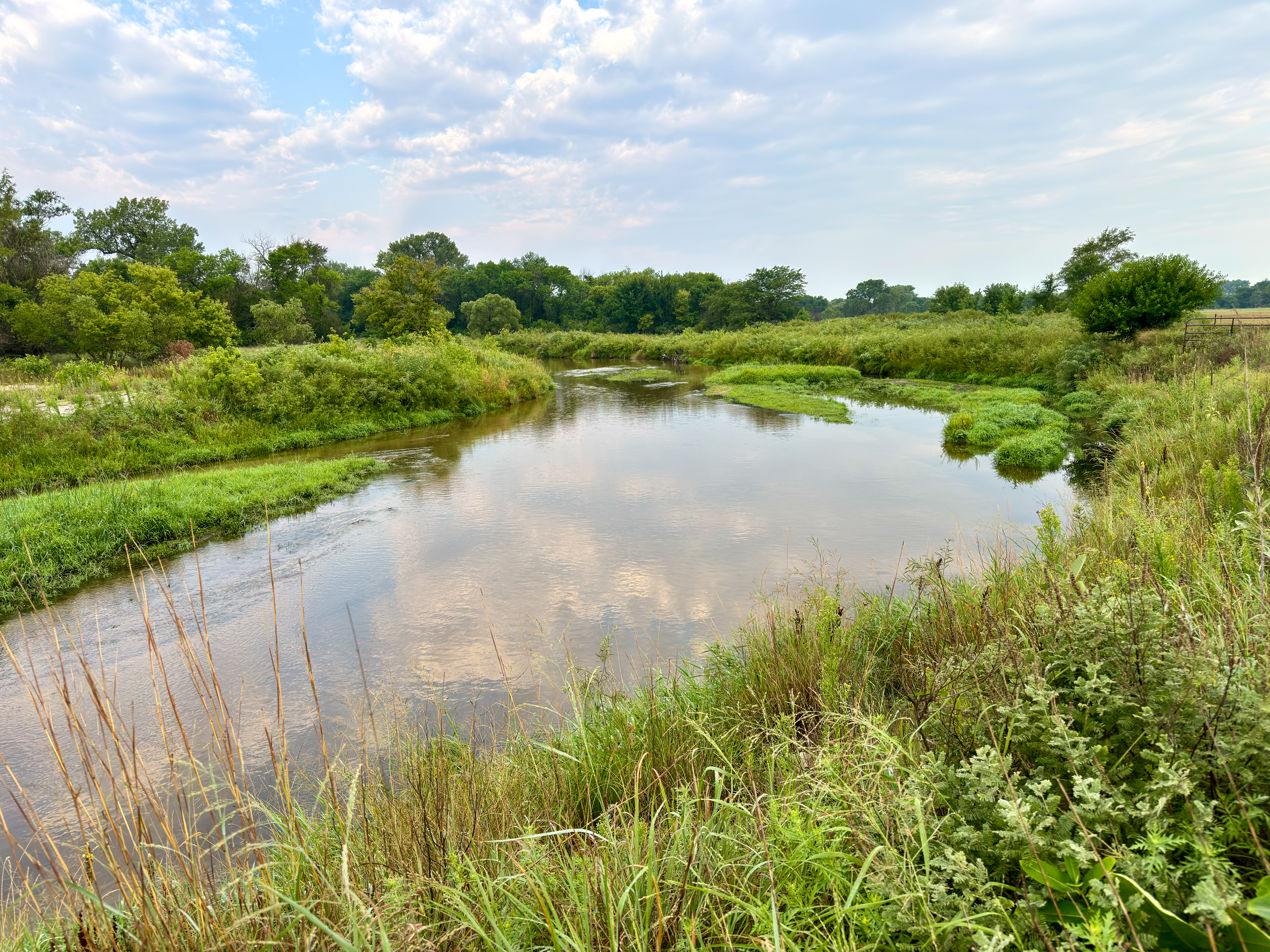
- The Elkhorn River in Dry Creek State Wildlife Management Area, Holt County, Nebraska

- Location of the mouth of the Elkhorn River in Nebraska

Physical characteristics
- Source
  - location: Confluence of North Fork and South Fork
  - coordinates: 42°36′36″N 099°11′00″W
  - elevation: 2,162 ft (659 m)
- Mouth
  - location: Confluence with Platte
  - coordinates: 41°07′12″N 096°18′42″W
  - elevation: 1,070 ft (330 m)
- Length: 290 mi (470 km)
- Discharge
  - location: near Waterloo
  - average: 1,529 cu ft/s (43.3 m^{3}/s)

Basin features
- Progression: Platte—Missouri—Mississippi

The Elkhorn River is a river in northeastern Nebraska, United States, that originates in the eastern Sandhills and is one of the largest tributaries of the Platte River, flowing 290 miles (470 km) and joining the Platte just southwest of Omaha, approximately 1 mile (1.6 km) south and 3 miles (4.8 km) west of Gretna.

Located in northeast and north-central Nebraska, the Elkhorn River basin encompasses approximately 7,000 square miles (18,000 km^{2}). The Elkhorn has several tributaries, including its own North and South forks, Logan Creek Dredge, Rock Creek and Maple Creek.

== History ==
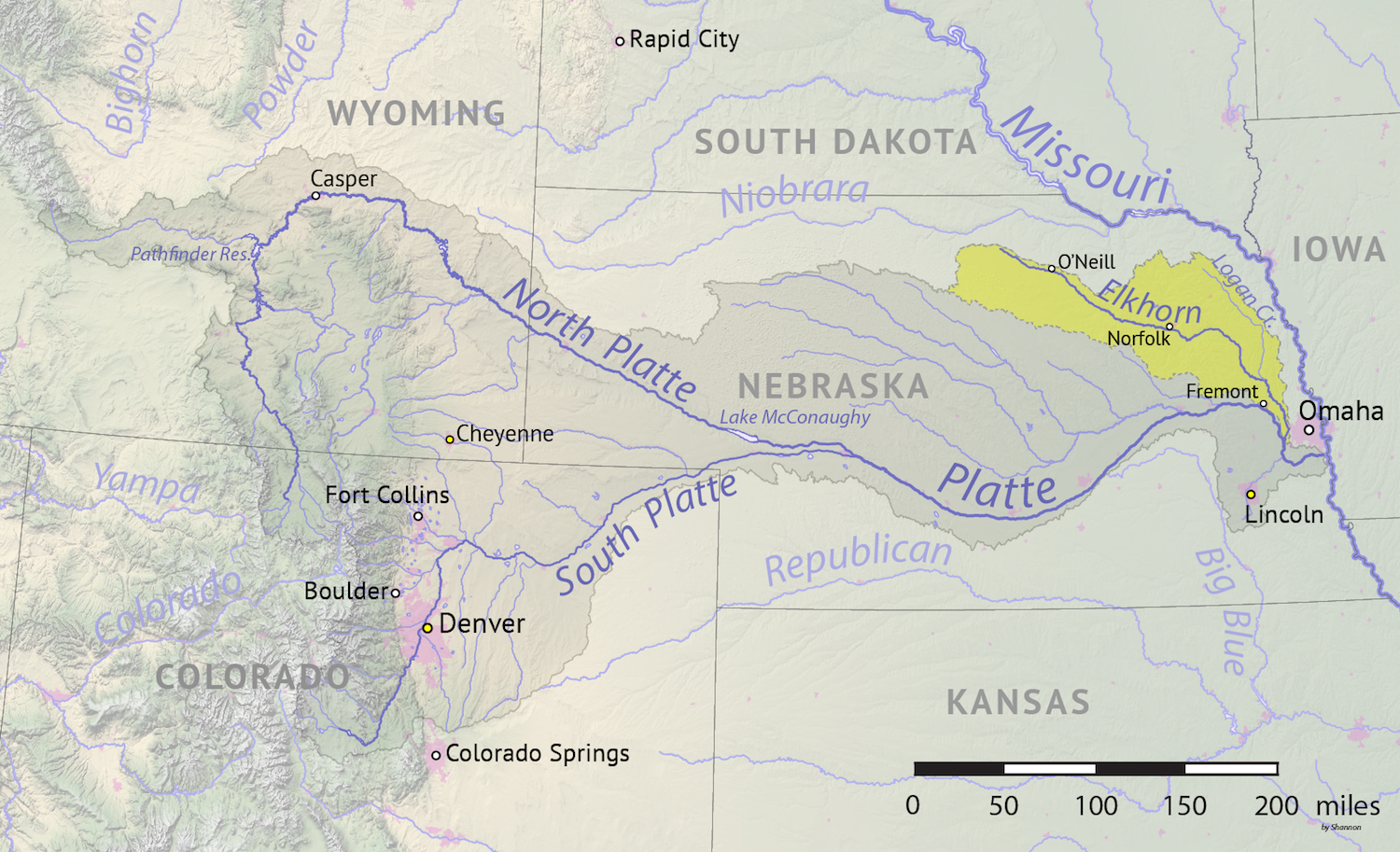
The Platte River and tributaries, including the Elkhorn River

The Lewis and Clark Expedition encountered the Elkhorn River near its confluence with the Platte, and referred to it as the "Corne de Cerf". Located a few miles north of the confluence is the Elkhorn Crossing Recreation Area. This public park, operated by the Papio-Missouri River Natural Resources District, marks the location where thousands of immigrants in the nineteenth century, bound for the west, camped while waiting to cross the river.

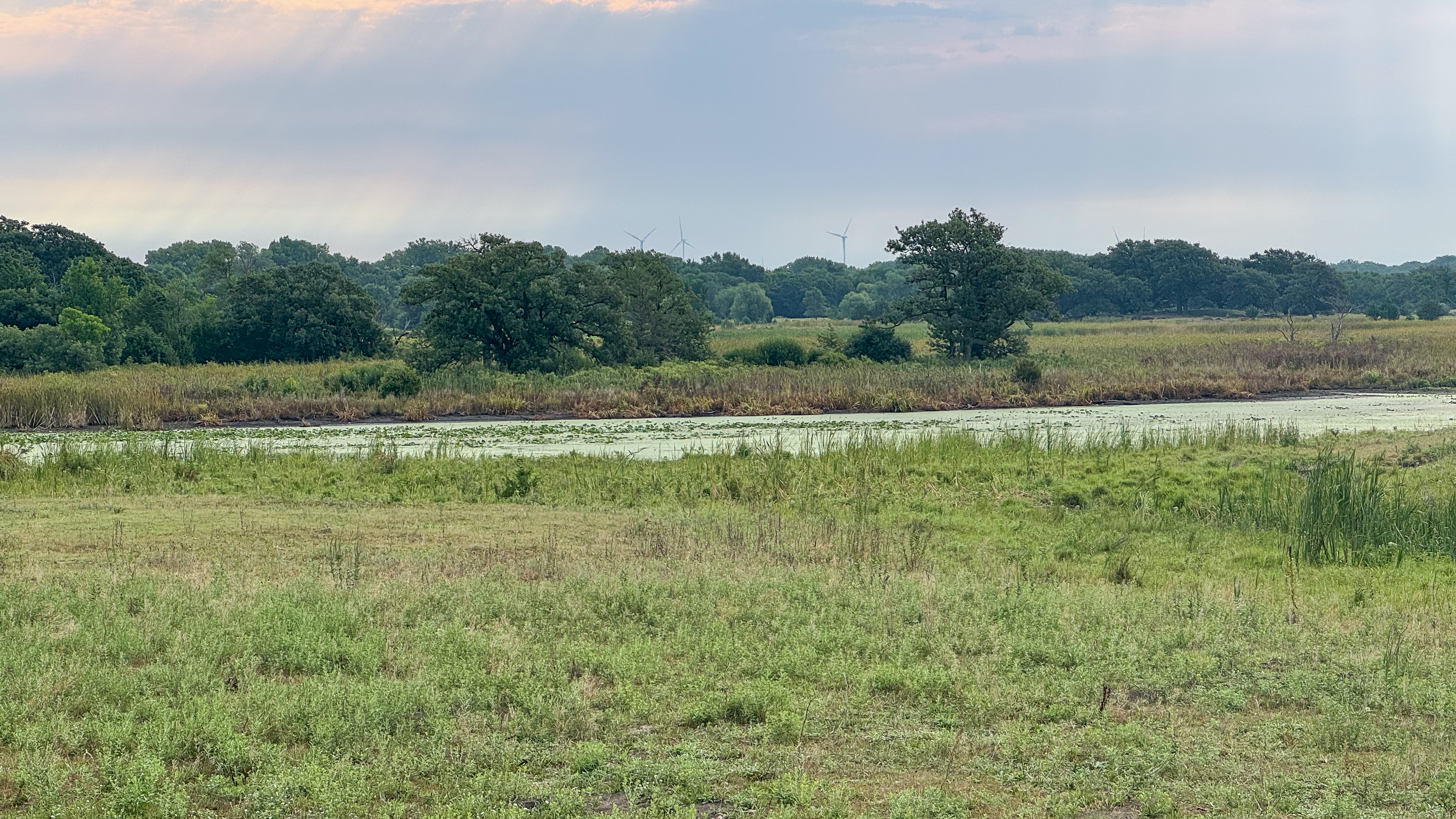
Oxbow Lake of Elkhorn River

For years Logan Fontenelle and Joseph LaFlesche, young mixed-race men who worked with the Omaha people, owned the ferry that carried people, wagons and animals between the two river banks. LaFlesche had been adopted by Omaha chief Big Elk and named as his successor. Fontenelle, of Omaha-French descent, served the tribe as an interpreter in relations with the US Indian agent and negotiations with the government over cession of lands.

== See also ==
- List of Nebraska rivers
- Mormon Trail
