= National Register of Historic Places listings in Dawes County, Nebraska =

Location of Dawes County in Nebraska

Dawes County, Nebraska, United States, has 17 properties and districts listed on the National Register of Historic Places, including one National Historic Landmark.

The locations of National Register properties and districts for which the latitude and longitude coordinates are included below may be seen in a map.

This National Park Service list is complete through NPS recent listings posted October 30, 2026.

== Current listings ==
	Name on the Register	Image	Date listed	Location	City or town	Description
1	Army Theatre	Army Theatre	July 7, 1988 (#88000930)	Fort Robinson State Park; 42°39′59″N 103°27′58″W	Crawford	
2	Bordeaux Trading Post	Bordeaux Trading Post	March 16, 1972 (#72000746)	3 miles east of Chadron on U.S. Route 20; 42°49′25″N 102°55′27″W	Chadron	
3	Chadron Commercial Historic District	Chadron Commercial Historic District	March 27, 2007 (#06001059)	Main St. and 2nd St. 42°49′52″N 103°00′03″W	Chadron	
4	Chadron Public Library	Chadron Public Library	June 21, 1990 (#90000985)	507 Bordeaux St. 42°49′35″N 102°59′58″W	Chadron	
5	Co-operative Block Building	Co-operative Block Building	September 12, 1985 (#85002146)	435-445 2nd 42°41′06″N 103°24′47″W	Crawford	
6	Crites Hall	Crites Hall	September 8, 1983 (#83001083)	10th and Main Sts. 42°49′13″N 103°00′01″W	Chadron	Student services for Chadron State College
7	Dawes County Courthouse	Dawes County Courthouse	July 5, 1990 (#90000975)	S. Main St. between 4th and 5th Sts. 42°49′57″N 103°19′51″W	Chadron	
8	Fort Robinson and Red Cloud Agency	Fort Robinson and Red Cloud Agency	October 15, 1966 (#66000442)	2 miles west of Crawford; 42°40′02″N 103°27′13″W	Crawford	Extends into Sioux County
9	Hotel Chadron	Hotel Chadron	August 15, 2002 (#02000859)	115 Main St. 42°49′56″N 103°00′02″W	Chadron	
10	Library	Library	September 8, 1983 (#83001084)	10th and Main Sts. 42°49′12″N 103°00′08″W	Chadron	Now the Mari Sandoz High Plains Heritage Center
11	Miller Hall	Miller Hall	September 8, 1983 (#83001085)	10th and Main Sts. 42°51′51″N 103°00′03″W	Chadron	Academic offices, classrooms and IT for Chadron State College
12	Sparks Hall	Sparks Hall	September 8, 1983 (#83001086)	10th and Main Sts. 42°49′11″N 103°00′00″W	Chadron	Administration for Chadron State College
13	US Post Office-Crawford	US Post Office-Crawford	May 11, 1992 (#92000477)	144 Main St. 42°41′13″N 103°24′49″W	Crawford	One of 12 Nebraska post offices featuring a Section of Fine Arts mural, "The Crossing" (1940) by G. Glenn Newell.
14	Henry Wohlers, Sr. Homestead	Henry Wohlers, Sr. Homestead	October 15, 2004 (#04000800)	Address restricted	Crawford	Now operated as Pine Ridge Hunting and Lodging.
15	Edna Work Hall	Edna Work Hall	September 8, 1983 (#83001087)	10th and Main Sts. 42°49′14″N 103°00′07″W	Chadron	Dormitory for Chadron State College

== See also ==
- List of National Historic Landmarks in Nebraska
- National Register of Historic Places listings in Nebraska
