= Russ Thompson =

American football player (1912–2001)

- Thompson, circa 1934

No. 29, 25
- Position: Tackle

Personal information
- Born: May 10, 1912; Whitney, Nebraska, U.S.
- Died: February 12, 2001 (aged 88); Scottsbluff, Nebraska, U.S.
- Listed height: 6 ft 5 in (1.96 m)
- Listed weight: 249 lb (113 kg)

Career information
- High school: Chadron (Chadron, Nebraska)
- College: Nebraska

Career history
- St. Louis Blues (1935); Chicago Bears (1936–1939); Philadelphia Eagles (1940)
- Stats at Pro Football Reference

Russell John Thompson (May 10, 1912 – February 12, 2001) was an American professional football tackle who played in the National Football League (NFL) with the Chicago Bears and Philadelphia Eagles. He played college football for the Nebraska Cornhuskers.

== Early life ==
Russell John Thompson was born on May 10, 1912, in Whitney, Nebraska. He attended Chadron High School in Chadron, Nebraska.

== College career ==
Thompson began his college football career at Nebraska State Teachers College. He transferred to the University of Nebraska, where he was a varsity letterman for the Cornhuskers football team from 1933 to 1934. In February 1934, he joined the Cornhuskers basketball team as a center.

== Professional career ==
On September 16, 1935, Thompson signed with the St. Louis Blues before the start of the 1935 season. The Blues were champions of the American Football League in 1934. He was a starter at tackle for the Blues in 1935.

Thompson played in 42 regular season games, starting 23, at tackle for the Chicago Bears from 1936 to 1939. He also played in the 1937 NFL Championship Game in a reserve role. On February 15, 1940, Thompson and Milt Trost were traded to the Philadelphia Eagles for future Pro Football Hall of Famer George McAfee and Joe Mihal. Thompson played in all 11 games, starting five, for the Eagles during the 1940 season.

== Personal life ==
Thompson later lived in Lusk, Wyoming. He died on February 12, 2001, in Scottsbluff, Nebraska.
