= Chardon =

Chardon may refer to:

== Places ==
- Chardon, Kansas
- Chardon, Ohio
- Chardon Township, Geauga County, Ohio

== People ==
- Carlos E. Chardón (born 1897), Puerto Rican mycologist and Chancellor of the University of Puerto Rico
- Carlos Fernando Chardón (born 1907), former Secretary of State of Puerto Rico and Puerto Rico Adjutant General
- Carlos A. Chardón López (born 1939), former Secretary (Commissioner) of Education of the Puerto Rico Department of Education
- Jean-Baptiste Chardon, a French Jesuit missionary in New France
- Phoebe A. Chardon (1933–2023), American politician

== Other ==
- The Chardon Polka Band, a polka band from Chardon, Ohio
- Chardon, whaling ship in late 1700s

== See also ==
- Chadron (disambiguation)
