= Zac Alcorn =

American football player (born 1980)

No. 49
- Position: Tight end

Personal information
- Born: August 24, 1980 (age 46) northwest Nebraska, U.S.
- Listed height: 6 ft 4 in (1.93 m)
- Listed weight: 255 lb (116 kg)

Career information
- High school: Chadron (NE)
- College: Chadron State (1999–2002); Black Hills State (2004–2005)
- NFL draft: 2006: undrafted

Career history
- Green Bay Packers (2006); San Francisco 49ers (2007)*; Kansas City Chiefs (2007)*; Seattle Seahawks (2008)*
- * Offseason or practice squad member only

Career NFL statistics
- Total tackles: 3
- Stats at Pro Football Reference

Zachary McKensie Alcorn (born August 24, 1980) is an American former professional football player who was a tight end in the National Football League (NFL). He played college football for the Chadron State Eagles and Black Hills State Yellow Jackets. After going unselected in the 2006 NFL draft, Alcorn signed with the Green Bay Packers as an undrafted free agent and played one season for them. He later was a member of the San Francisco 49ers, Kansas City Chiefs and Seattle Seahawks. He remains the only player from Black Hills State to ever play in the NFL.

== Early life ==
Alcorn was born on August 24, 1980, at a farm in northwest Nebraska, United States. He is related to two inductees to the Chadron State College Athletic Hall of Fame: his uncle Tom, and grandfather Gene, both football players. Alcorn grew up on the farm. The Capital Times noted that "the nearest town, Hay Springs, boasts a mere 652 residents. The closest NFL franchise, the Denver Broncos, is five hours away. And that's the only team within a 600-mile radius." Alcorn attended Chadron Senior High School, 35 miles (56 km) away from his home, where he participated in three sports: football, basketball, and track and field. Alcorn was an all-conference and all-state football player and was also all-state in basketball, helping Chadron to two Class B state championship wins. In football, he played as a linebacker, tight end, and defensive end, and he also competed in the discus throw in track and field. Alcorn posted 41 receptions for 613 yards and seven touchdowns in his senior football season. At the end of his high school career, he was invited to the West Nebraska All-Star Football Game and the Nebraska Shrine Bowl. Alcorn graduated from high school in 1999 and afterwards enrolled at Chadron State College, where he played for the Chadron State Eagles football team.

== College career ==
As a freshman at Chadron State, Alcorn redshirted. In 2000, playing as a tight end, he posted 16 receptions for 208 yards and a touchdown. Alcorn was also a member of Chadron State's basketball team during the 2000–01 season. However, he missed the entire 2001 football season due to an injury to his posterior cruciate ligament (PCL) he suffered during a softball game. He later pulled a calf muscle which resulted in him missing most of the practices before the 2002 season. Alcorn only caught four passes for 34 yards in the first two games during the 2002 season and then quit the team due to frustration with not being used much. He did not play football in 2003.

Alcorn then enrolled at Black Hills State University in Spearfish, South Dakota, joining the Black Hills State Yellow Jackets football team in 2004. Black Hills State then competed as a member of the National Association of Intercollegiate Athletics (NAIA), the lowest level of college football. In the 2004 season, he caught 42 passes for 531 yards and five touchdowns. As a senior in 2005, he was an NAIA All-America performer and caught 43 passes for 689 yards and seven touchdowns, placing first on the team in each category as the Yellow Jackets compiled a record of 7–3. Alcorn was also a first-team All-Dakota Athletic Conference selection. He concluded his stint at Black Hills State with 85 receptions for 1,220 yards and 12 touchdowns. At the conclusion of his collegiate career, he was invited to the Magnolia Gridiron All-Star Classic.

Despite playing at a low-level school, Alcorn received attention from NFL teams toward the end of his collegiate career. The Clarion-Ledger noted that "Alcorn ... made Spearfish, a town of some 10,000 in the heart of the Black Hills of western South Dakota, a destination for NFL scouts for the first time". Black Hills State coach John Scott said, "I've been here four years and we've never had a scout come through here before this year. We had 16 teams come through to look at Zac ... When a guy has the kind of talent he has, word gets around. I've been in this for 25 years and I've never seen a guy able to use his body and snatch balls out of the air like he can." In college, he was able to run the 40-yard dash in 4.6 seconds, squat 490 pounds (220 kg), bench press 355 pounds (161 kg), and posted a vertical jump of 34 inches (86 cm). After his college career, he participated at the DakotaDome pro day, attracting the attention of several NFL teams.

== Professional career ==
After going unselected in the 2006 NFL draft, Alcorn signed with the Green Bay Packers as an undrafted free agent. In an interview with The Capital Times, he described the major differences between the NFL and the NAIA, stating that he did not use a playbook in college, while in the NFL, he needed to learn a book "eight inches thick ... It's huge: 25 pounds (11 kg)". He also described the city of Green Bay, Wisconsin, with a population of 100,000, as "huge", while many of his teammates talked about how small it was. The paper noted that the closest town to his home had only a few hundred residents, while Chadron had 5,300 residents and Spearfish 8,000. Lyle Hare Stadium, where Alcorn played in college, had a capacity of 4,200, while the Packers' stadium, Lambeau Field, held 70,000.

In practice with the Packers, Alcorn stood out for his catching skills, and coach Mike McCarthy said he had "the best hands on the team". He was released on September 2, 2006, at the final roster cuts, but then was re-signed to the practice squad two days later. After 11 weeks on the practice squad, he was promoted to the active roster on November 18, 2006. He made his NFL debut the next day in a loss to the New England Patriots. Alcorn became the only NFL player to ever come from Black Hills State, a distinction he still holds. He ended up appearing in six games as a backup tight end and special teamer, recording three tackles. Alcorn impressed in training camp in 2007 while competing for the team's third tight end spot but was ultimately released on September 1, 2007.

On September 11, 2007, Alcorn signed with the San Francisco 49ers' practice squad. He was released on November 27 and later signed with the Kansas City Chiefs practice squad on December 12, where he remained until the end of the season. After the season, Alcorn signed with the Seattle Seahawks on January 16, 2008. He injured his back on the first day of preseason camp and was released by Seattle at the end of July. Alcorn concluded his NFL career with six games played and three tackles.

== Personal life ==
Alcorn and his wife, Jennifer, have three children: one son and two daughters. Their son, Justus, played quarterback at Chadron High School and later for the South Dakota Mines Hardrockers. After his football career, Alcorn worked at Universal Athletics. He also played in a South Dakota flag football league. Alcorn was inducted into the Black Hills State Athletic Hall of Fame in 2016.
