= Chadron =

Chadron may refer to:

- Chadron, Nebraska, United States
- Chadron, Haute-Loire, France
- Chadron State College, a college in Chadron, Nebraska
- Hotel Chadron, a hotel in Chadron, Nebraska
- Chadron Moore, also known by his stage name Nitti Beatz, American record producer
