= Crites Hall =

- U.S. National Register of Historic Places
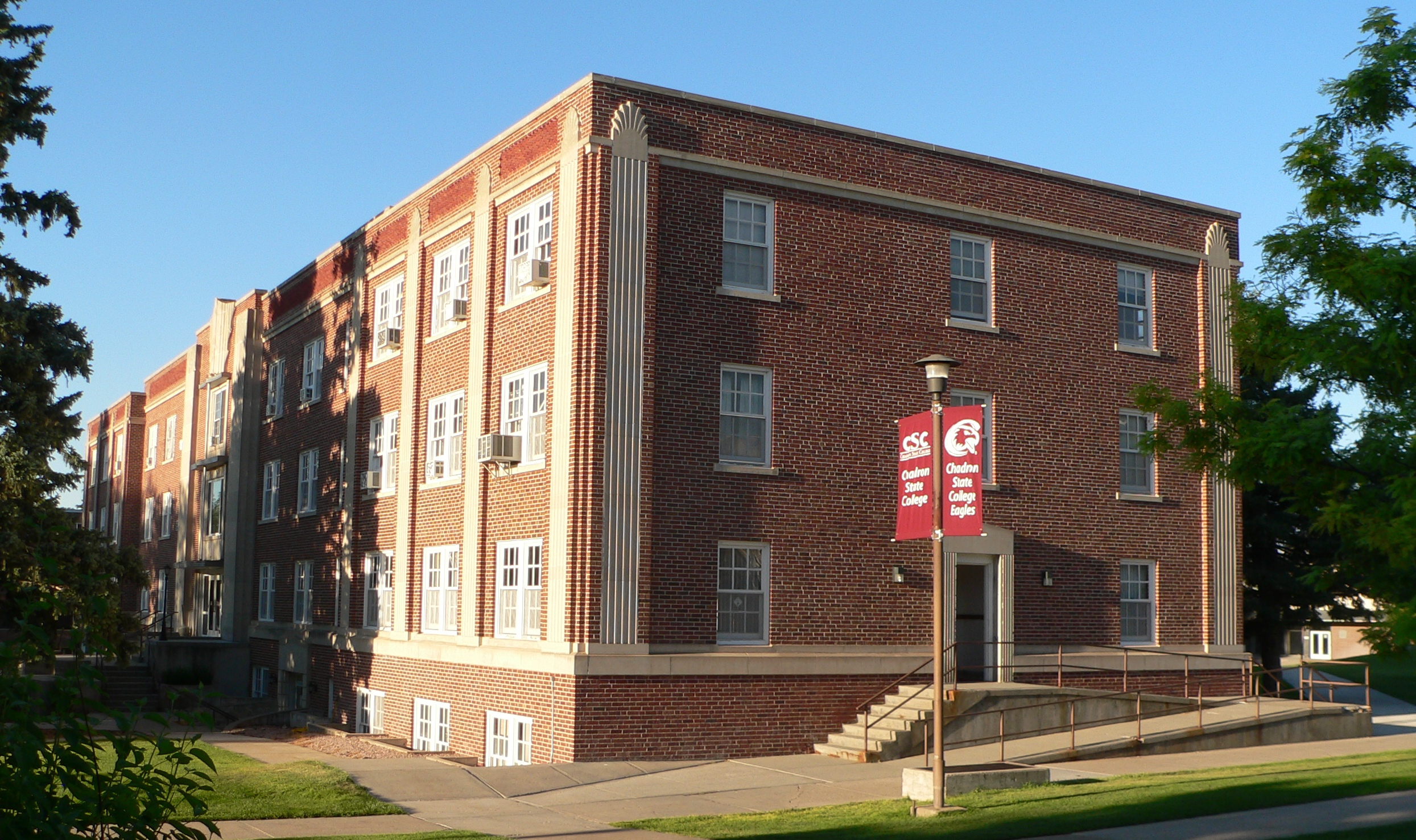

- Location within Nebraska Location within the United States
- Location: 10th and Main Sts., Chadron, Nebraska
- Coordinates: 42°49′13″N 103°0′1″W
- Area: less than one acre
- Built: 1938
- Architect: Shattuck, Gordon
- Architectural style: Art Deco
- MPS: Chadron State College Historic Buildings TR
- NRHP reference No.: 83001083
- Added to NRHP: September 8, 1983

Crites Hall, at 10th and Main Sts. in Chadron, Nebraska, is the student services building of Chadron State College. The building is historic, dating from 1938, and is listed on the National Register of Historic Places. It is in Art Deco style, designed by architect Gordon Shattuck, and was the first men's dormitory at the college. It was listed on the National Register of Historic Places in 1983.

It is named for Edwin D. Crites (1884-1953), a first generation northwestern-Nebraskan who spent his career as an attorney in Chadron and was a State Normal Board member from 1931 to 1953.

Gordon Shattuck also designed the H. J. Bartenbach House, in Grand Island, Nebraska, which is also NRHP-listed.
