= Nebraska State Teachers College =

Nebraska State Teachers College may refer to:

- University of Nebraska at Kearney, Kearney, Nebraska, known as Nebraska State Teachers College, 1921–1963
- Peru State College, Peru, known as Nebraska State Teachers College at Peru, 1921–1949
- Wayne State College, Wayne, Nebraska, known as Nebraska State Teachers College at Wayne, 1949–1963
- Chadron State College, Chadron, Nebraska, known as Chadron State Teacher's College, 1921–1963
