= Ron K. Patterson =

American university administrator

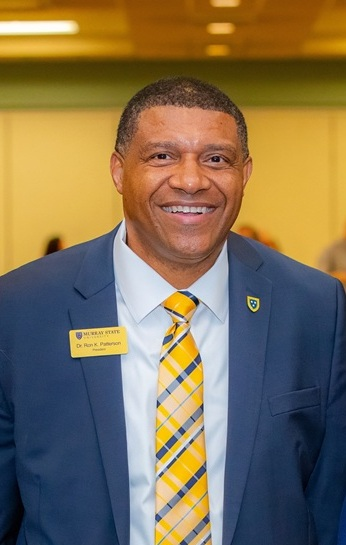
- Patterson in 2025

President of Murray State University
- Incumbent
- Assumed office July 1, 2025
- Preceded by: Bob Jackson

President of Chadron State College
- In office July 1, 2023 – June 9, 2025
- Preceded by: Randy Rhine

Personal details
- Born: Corinth, MS
- Spouse: Jenny Patterson
- Children: 2
- Education: University of Tennessee Southern (BS); Arkansas State University (ES); Marietta College (MAEd); Creighton University (EdD)
- Occupation: University administration

Ron K. Patterson is an American university administrator. Since 2025 he has been the president of Murray State University in Murray, Kentucky; he was previously the president of Chadron State College in Chadron, Nebraska.

== Early life and education ==
Patterson was raised in Corinth, Mississippi, and has two younger sisters. A first-generation college student, he transferred from Northeast Mississippi Community College to complete his bachelor's degree in human services at the University of Tennessee Southern, and later earned an education specialist degree with a concentration in community college administration from Arkansas State University. In 2002, he earned a master's degree in education from Marietta College in Marietta, Ohio. In 2022 he earned a Doctor of Education degree in the interdisciplinary leadership program at Creighton University.

== Career ==
Patterson began his career coaching basketball and golf at Tusculum College in Tusculum, Tennessee, and Marietta College in Marietta, Ohio. He then changed careers to become an administrator, first as an admissions counselor at Christian Brothers University in Memphis and subsequently as vice president for enrollment management at Marietta College, as director of admissions and enrollment services at the University of Central Arkansas in Conway, and at the University of Tennessee Health Science Center in Memphis. He then served for six years as associate vice president at the University of North Alabama in Florence, for the last two years as the university's first vice president of diversity, equity, and inclusion.

In 2023, after completing his doctorate, he became President of Chadron State College, where he spearheaded a new five-year plan. In 2025 he was appointed president of Murray State University, beginning his term that July. Soon after his appointment, he conducted a listening and learning tour with almost 40 stops across the multi-state region. A series of special events took place on April 13–14, 2026 for Patterson's inauguration, including the investiture ceremony as the 15th President of Murray State University.

== Personal life ==
Patterson and his wife Jenny have two children.
