= Nebraska State Normal School =

Nebraska State Normal School may refer to:

- Peru State College, Peru, Nebraska, known as Nebraska State Normal School, 1867–1921
- University of Nebraska at Kearney, Kearney, Nebraska, known as Nebraska State Normal School at Kearney, 1905–1921
- Wayne State College, Wayne, Nebraska, known as State Normal School, 1910–1921, and as State Normal School and Teacher's College, 1921–1949
- Chadron State College, Chadron, Nebraska, known as Nebraska State Normal School, 1911–1921
