= Pine Ridge, Nebraska =

Pine Ridge, Nebraska may refer to:

- Whiteclay, Nebraska, known to the U.S. Census Bureau as "Pine Ridge, Nebraska"
- Pine Ridge (region)
- Pine Ridge, Dawes County, Nebraska
