= Erin Blankenship =

American statistician

- Title: Professor of statistics
- Awards: William D. Warde Statistical Education Award

Academic background
- Education: North Carolina State University
- Influences: Gertrude Mary Cox

Academic work
- Discipline: Statistics
- Sub-discipline: Statistics education
- Institutions: University of Nebraska–Lincoln
- Doctoral students: Jennifer L. Green
- Main interests: Nonlinear models Environmental statistics

Erin E. Blankenship is an American statistician interested in nonlinear models and environmental statistics, and known for her work in statistics education. She is a professor of statistics at the University of Nebraska–Lincoln.

== Recognition ==
Blankenship is the 2013 winner of the Mu Sigma Rho William D. Warde Statistical Education Award, and in 2015 was elected as a Fellow of the American Statistical Association "for innovation and leadership in K-12 teacher development; for excellence in teaching, mentoring, and inspiring future teachers, teaching assistants, and statistics education researchers; and for interdisciplinary collaboration and service to the profession". In 2017, she was one of two winners of the highest teaching honor of the University of Nebraska system, the Outstanding Teaching and Instructional Creativity Award.

== Education and research directions ==
Blankenship did her graduate studies at North Carolina State University, and credits an early female NCSU statistics professor, Gertrude Mary Cox, as a source of inspiration. Blankenship states that went into statistics because of its teamwork, and because, she says, "You’re applying science to find real solutions to real problems". Initially a research statistician, she gained her interest in statistics education after earning tenure at Nebraska.
