= Poe Ballantine =

American writer

Poe Ballantine (born 1955 in Denver, Colorado) is the pen name of Edwin Hughes, a fiction and nonfiction writer known for his novels and especially his essays, many of which appear in The Sun. His second novel, Decline of the Lawrence Welk Empire, won Foreword Magazine’s Book of the Year. The odd jobs, eccentric characters, boarding houses, buses, and beer that populate Ballantine’s work often draw comparisons to the life and work of Charles Bukowski and Jack Kerouac.

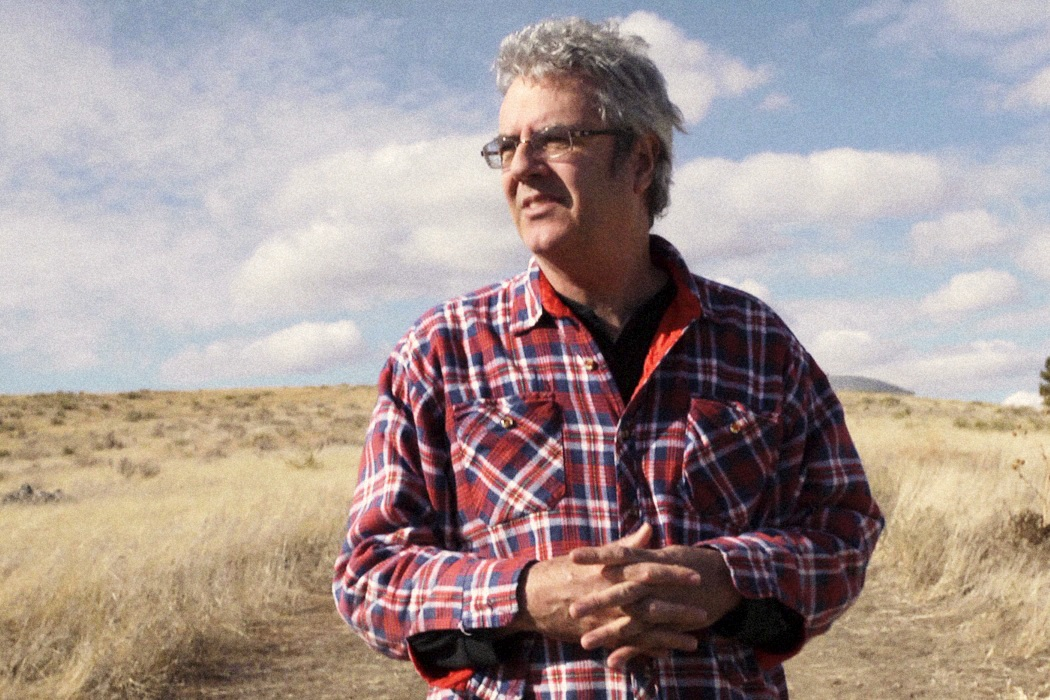
Poe Ballantine, author photo by Dave Jannetta

One of Ballantine’s short stories, "The Blue Devils of Blue River Avenue", was included in Best American Short Stories 1998; one of his essays, "501 Minutes to Christ", appeared in Best American Essays 2006. His essay "Free Rent at the Totalitarian Hotel" (originally published in The Sun) opened Best American Essays 2013. Ballantine's essays and short stories have also appeared in the Coal City Review, Kenyon Review, and Atlantic Monthly. He has guest blogged for PowellsBooks.Blog and Marion Roach Smith's "Writing Lessons."

In 2013 Hawthorne Books & Literary Arts published Ballantine's memoir, Love & Terror on the Howling Plains of Nowhere with an introduction by Cheryl Strayed. Praised by Bruce Jacobs in Shelf Awareness as a "funny memoir and 'true crime' mashup by one of the country's best vagabond raconteurs" and by Cheryl Strayed as "his best book ever", the memoir follows Ballantine's interest in the disappearance of a professor from the town of Chadron, Nebraska. Love & Terror and the true crime circumstances that surround its creation are also the subject of a documentary of the same name by filmmaker Dave Jannetta.

Poe Ballantine lives in Chadron, Nebraska with his wife Cristina and their son Thomas Francisco.

== Love and Terror on the Howling Plains of Nowhere ==
In 2013 Ballantine published Love and Terror on the Howling Plains of Nowhere, a memoir of his life in Chadron. The narrative follows two arcs. One follows Ballantine's personal life, including his decision to settle in Chadron, his marriage to Cristina, a Mexican woman, and Tom, their autistic son. According to Ballantine, his marriage to Cristina was difficult in its early years, and the couple would sometimes fight. However, once Cristina's proficiency with English improved to the point that she could appreciate Ballantine's sense of humor, the relationship improved as well.

The second arc concerns the disappearance and death of Steven Haataja (pronounced hah-de-yah), a mathematician (Note: Haataja was an algebraist, a mathematician specializing in abstract algebra. Haataja's professional work included his doctoral dissertation and an article (posthumously) co-authored with his doctoral advisors, both dealing with inverse semigroups and C*-algebras.) who had been hired in 2006 as a professor at Chadron State College. (Note: Although Ballantine acknowledged in an author's note that he had used "fictive techniques" and changed selected names throughout the memoir, he also underlined that the details specific to Haataja's case were factually accurate.) In December 2006, after having lived in Chadron for a few months, Haataja disappeared. He was listed as a missing person until the spring of 2007, when his body was found badly burned and tied to a tree on a ranch property south of the college. The nature of Haataja's death led Ballantine and other Chadron residents to believe that it was a homicide, possibly a hate crime—unfounded rumors had circulated within the community that Haataja might have been gay, a possibility which was rejected by the official investigation. Although the investigation was inconclusive, the county sheriff and other law enforcement officers privately considered Haataja's death to be a suicide, for multiple reasons: no DNA other than Haataja's was found at the scene, no signs of foul play were found, and although Haataja's legs and body were bound to the tree, his hands were free. Further, Haataja suffered from depression and had previously attempted suicide. Despite these details, Ballantine and others who had known Haataja rejected the possibility of suicide, noting that he was happy and well-liked in the community, and that the manner of his death was inconsistent with his personality.

The memoir was later adapted as a documentary film, treating the same subject matter.

== Books ==
- Things I Like About America (2002) nonfiction/essays
- God Clobbers Us All (2004) fiction
- Decline of the Lawrence Welk Empire (2006) fiction, sequel to God Clobbers Us All
- 501 Minutes to Christ (2007) nonfiction/essays
- Love & Terror on the Howling Plains of Nowhere (2013) nonfiction/memoir
- Guidelines For Mountain Lion Safety (2015)
- Whirlaway (2018) fiction

God Clobbers Us All and its sequel Decline of the Lawrence Welk Empire both feature the fictional Edgar Donahoe as he makes his way from Southern California to the Caribbean. Publishers Weekly noted that "It's impossible not to be charmed by the narrator of Poe Ballantine's comic and sparklingly intelligent God Clobbers Us All."

Ballantine's other works include short stories and creative nonfiction essays, as well as his memoir, Love & Terror on the Howling Plains of Nowhere. Much of his work features themes of American alienation and lives in transit. In Love & Terror these themes, alongside his expressive self-awareness, are expanded as Ballantine sets down roots in Chadron, Nebraska and begins to investigate the disappearance of a local professor.

== Nominations and recognition ==
- Nominations for the Pushcart Prize and O. Henry Prize.
- Winner of a Pushcart Prize for Father Junipero Admonishes a Bird (2016)
- Winner of a Pushcart Prize for Secrets Deep in Tiger Forests (2019)
- His essays have appeared in the Best American Essays series in 2006 and 2013 and in Best American Short Stories in 1998.
- Decline of the Lawrence Welk Empire was Foreword Magazine’s Book of the Year.

== Films ==
- Love & Terror on the Howling Plains of Nowhere dir. Dave Jannetta, based on Love & Terror on the Howling Plains of Nowhere.
  - Premiered at the Hot Docs International Film Festival in 2014
  - www.loveandterror.com
