= Bordeaux, Nebraska =

Unincorporated community in Nebraska, United States

- Unincorporated Community
- Location within Nebraska Location within the United States
- Coordinates: 42.8°N 102.8°W
- Country: United States
- State: Nebraska
- County: Dawes

Bordeaux is an unincorporated community in Dawes County, Nebraska, United States.

== History ==
Bordeaux took its name from Bordeaux Creek. A post office was established at Bordeaux in 1884, and remained in operation until it was discontinued in 1896.
