= George McAfee =

American football player (1918–2009)

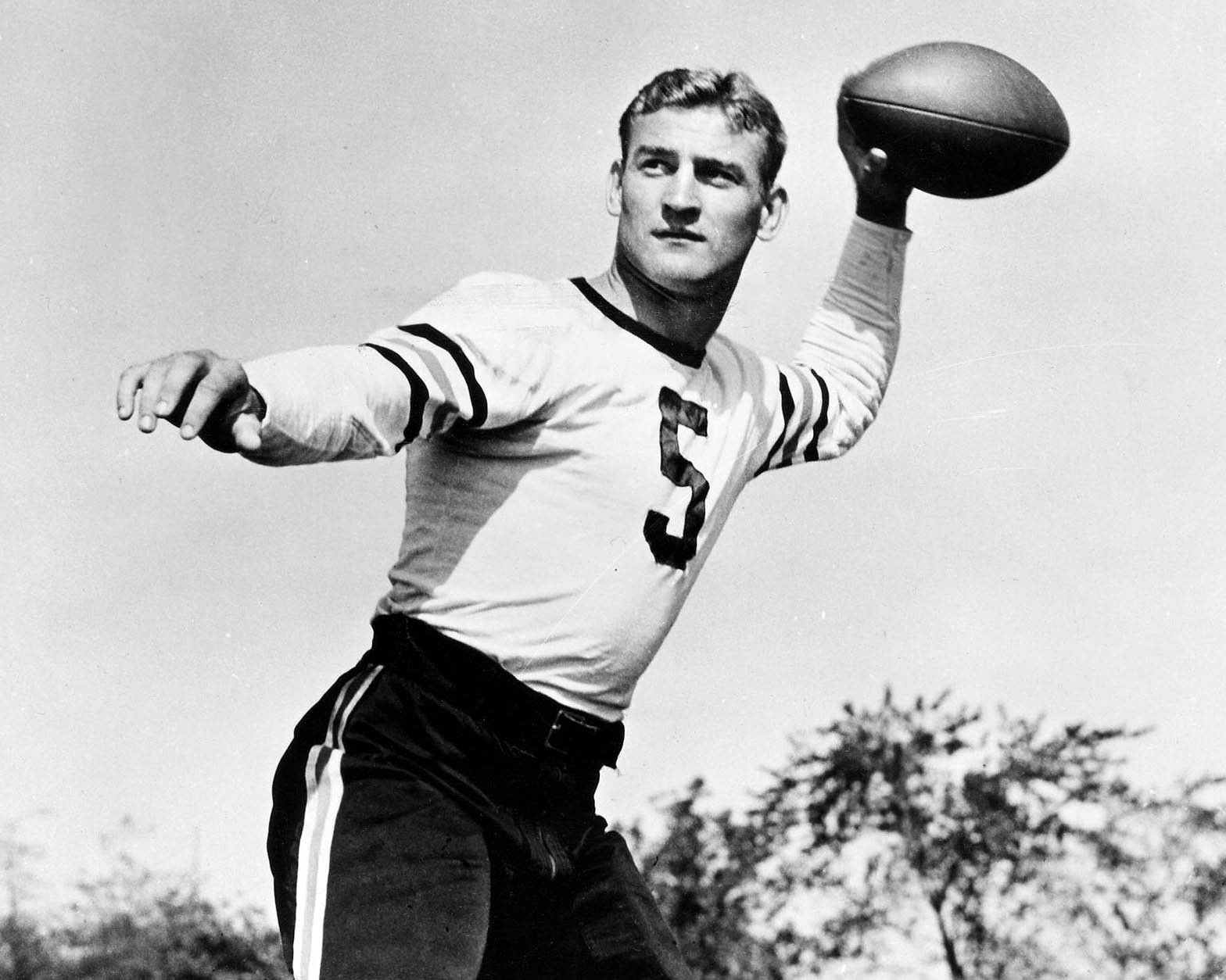
- McAfee with the Chicago Bears

No. 5, 33
- Positions: Halfback, defensive back, return specialist

Personal information
- Born: March 13, 1918; Corbin, Kentucky, U.S.
- Died: March 4, 2009 (aged 90); Durham, North Carolina, U.S.
- Listed height: 6 ft 0 in (1.83 m)
- Listed weight: 178 lb (81 kg)

Career information
- High school: Ironton (Ironton, Ohio)
- College: Duke (1937–1939)
- NFL draft: 1940: 1st round, 2nd overall pick

Career history
- Chicago Bears (1940–1941; 1945–1950)

Awards and highlights
- 3× NFL champion (1940, 1941, 1946); First-team All-Pro (1941); Pro Bowl (1941); NFL punt return yards leader (1948); NFL 1940s All-Decade Team; NFL 75th Anniversary All-Time Team; Chicago Bears No. 5 retired; 100 greatest Bears of All-Time; Second-team All-American (1939); First-team All-Southern (1939)

Career NFL statistics
- Rushing yards: 1,685
- Rushing touchdowns: 21
- Receptions: 85
- Receiving yards: 1,359
- Receiving touchdowns: 11
- Return yards: 1,919
- Return touchdowns: 4
- Interceptions: 25
- Military career
- Allegiance: United States
- Branch: United States Navy
- Service years: 1943–1945
- Conflicts: World War II
- Stats at Pro Football Reference
- Pro Football Hall of Fame
- College Football Hall of Fame

George Anderson McAfee (March 13, 1918 – March 4, 2009) was an American professional football halfback, defensive back and return specialist who played for the Chicago Bears from 1940 to 1941 and 1945 to 1950 in the National Football League (NFL). As an undergraduate at Duke University, McAfee starred in baseball and track and field as well as college football. McAfee was elected to the College Football Hall of Fame and the Pro Football Hall of Fame. As of 2018, he still holds the NFL record for punt return average in a career.

== Early life and college ==
George McAfee was born in Corbin, Kentucky. He was the 10th of 12 children, and he often joked that the first children awake in the morning were the only ones who could wear shoes for the day. Soon after his birth, his family moved to Ironton, Ohio, where he attended Ironton High School.

McAfee earned a scholarship to play college football at Duke University in 1937. During his three years at Duke, the team compiled a record of 24–4–1. He led the Blue Devils to Southern Conference (SoCon) championships in 1938 and 1939. The 1938 Duke Blue Devils football team was unscored upon and unbeaten until the Rose Bowl, when the USC Trojans scored a touchdown with less than a minute remaining to win, 7–3. That Duke team was nicknamed the Iron Dukes.

In his senior season in 1939, McAfee led the team in rushing, receiving, scoring, kickoff returns, punt returns, interceptions, and punting. He earned All-America honors from the Associated Press, United Press, Central Press, and Newspaper Enterprise Association, among others.

McAfee also batted .353 as a center fielder for the Duke Blue Devils baseball team and captured a Southern Conference 100-meter championship as a senior.

== Professional career ==
McAfee was selected by the Philadelphia Eagles with the second overall pick of the 1940 NFL draft. On February 15, 1940, McAfee and Joe Mihal were traded to the Chicago Bears for Russ Thompson and Milt Trost. Nicknamed "One-Play McAfee", he was known for explosive speed; he ran a 100-yard dash in 9.7 seconds. In his first professional game, McAfee returned a punt for a 75-yard touchdown with 30 seconds to play to beat the Brooklyn Dodgers. Later in his rookie season, he ran back a kickoff for 93 yards and threw a touchdown pass to help the Bears win over their rival, the Green Bay Packers. In the final game of the season, the 1940 NFL championship game, McAfee returned an interception for a 34-yard touchdown during the 73–0 victory over the Washington Redskins.

His second year in the League, 1941, was a banner year for McAfee: he led the league with a 7.3 rushing yards per carry while scoring a league-high 12 touchdowns in an 11-game season. While his rushing yardage totals seem modest by today's standards, he had to share the backfield with other outstanding running backs, such as Hugh Gallarneau, Norm Standlee, and Bill Osmanski, as well as Hall of Fame quarterback Sid Luckman. Known for his versatility, in 1941 his 12-touchdown total consisted of six by rushing, three receiving, one by punt return, one by kickoff return, and one by interception return, all while helping the Chicago Bears to their second straight NFL league championship over the New York Giants. That season, his 31.6 yards per punt return also set a franchise record that still stands.

Following his All-pro 1941 season, McAfee entered the Navy in World War II, returning for three games each in 1945 and 1946. He played four more seasons in the NFL, becoming more of a return specialist, especially after a disastrous 11-fumble season in 1948. In 1948 and 1950 he led the NFL in punt returns (30 for a league-leading 417 yards in 1948, 33 in 1950). In his final professional game, a division-round loss to the Los Angeles Rams, McAfee had six punt returns for 79 yards, setting the Bears' playoff franchise record for most returns in a game, and most yards and yards per return in a game, single post-season, and post-season career (a total of seven franchise records).

== Military career ==
McAfee volunteered to join the United States Navy after the U.S. entered World War II. He served between 1942 and 1945.

== Return to the NFL ==
McAfee returned to Chicago in 1945 after missing almost 4 complete seasons during what would likely have been the prime of his pro career. In his first game back, late in 1945, McAfee carried the ball five times for 105 yards and three touchdowns.

McAfee played for Chicago until 1950. While McAfee was not again voted to the All Pro team, he continued to excel on both offense and defense for the Bears.

During his time playing pro football, McAfee scored 234 points, gained 5,313 combined net yards, intercepted 25 passes in eight seasons, and was the NFL punt return champion. As of 2018, he remains the all-time NFL record holder for average punt return in a career at 12.78 yards.

McAfee's coach at Duke, Wallace Wade, called him "a one-man offense, and practically unstoppable." Red Grange, a star of earlier Bears teams, called McAfee "the most dangerous man with the football in the game." Green Bay Coach Earl "Curly" Lambeau called McAfee "the most talented back the Packers ever faced." John F. Kieran, the sports columnist for The New York Times, wrote in 1940: "the debate around Chicago has been as to whether McAfee is just as good as Jim Thorpe ever was, or better." George Halas, the Bears' longtime owner and coach, once said, "the highest compliment you can pay any ball carrier is just compare him with McAfee."

McAfee himself described his running strategy differently. At 6’, 178 pounds, he was small even for his era. During his initial training camp with the Bears, he was impressed by the size of the so-called Monsters of the Midway. "I never saw so many big men in my life," McAfee said at the time. "I remember clearly, on one of the first scrimmage plays, that a rookie halfback was knocked cold trying to bring down Bill Osmanski. That play served as a valuable lesson for me. Whenever I ran with the ball, I had that picture in my mind of [him] there on the ground, cold as a stone. I would run as fast as I could if there was any daylight."

== Honors ==
During his college football career, McAfee was named first-team All-American, helped the Duke Blue Devils to two Southern Conference championships, and was a member of the Iron Dukes, which narrowly lost the 1939 Rose Bowl to Southern Cal.

While starring as running back, defensive back, kicker, punter, and kick returner for the mighty Chicago Bears of the 1940s, McAfee was named All Pro, set the all-time career punt return mark, and contributed to the Bears' NFL championships in 1940, 1941, and 1946.

McAfee's jersey #5 was retired by Chicago in 1955. He entered the College Football Hall of Fame in 1961, the Pro Football Hall of Fame in 1966, the North Carolina Sports Hall of Fame in 1967, and the Duke Sports Hall of Fame in 1975, where he was a charter member. McAfee was also named to the NFL's 1940s All-Decade Team and the All-Time Two Way Team.

== NFL career statistics ==
Legend
	Won NFL Championship
	Led the league
**Bold**	Career high

Year	Team	Games		Rushing						Receiving					Fumbles		Interceptions				
Year	Team	GP	GS	Att	Yds	Avg	Y/G	Lng	TD	Rec	Yds	Avg	Lng	TD	Fum	FR	Int	Yds	Y/I	Lng	TD
1940	CHI	10	8	47	253	5.4	25.3	–	2	7	117	16.7	–	0	–	–	4	50	12.5	0	0
1941	CHI	11	2	65	**474**	7.3	43.1	**70**	**5**	7	144	20.6	39	**3**	–	–	**6**	**78**	13.0	43	0
1945	CHI	3	0	16	139	**8.7**	**46.3**	38	3	3	85	**28.3**	**65**	1	1	0	1	13	13.0	13	0
1946	CHI	3	0	14	53	3.8	17.7	14	0	10	137	13.7	25	3	0	1	3	18	6.0	18	0
1947	CHI	**12**	0	63	209	3.3	17.4	39	3	**32**	**492**	15.4	53	1	3	4	1	49	**49.0**	49	0
1948	CHI	**12**	8	**92**	392	4.3	32.7	23	**5**	17	227	13.4	50	2	**11**	**5**	2	35	17.5	25	0
1949	CHI	**12**	6	42	161	3.8	13.4	23	3	9	157	17.4	52	1	2	1	**6**	76	12.7	**54**	**1**
1950	CHI	**12**	**11**	2	4	2.0	0.3	4	0	0	0	0.0	0	0	0	2	2	31	15.5	19	0
Career		75	35	341	1,685	4.9	22.5	70	21	85	1,359	16.0	65	11	17	13	25	350	14.0	54	1

== Later life and death ==
After his retirement as a player in 1950, McAfee and his wife, Jeanne M. McAfee, moved back to Durham, where they raised their three children. Immediately upon his retirement, in 1950, McAfee worked as an NFL referee for several years. At the same time, he and his brother, Wes, started the McAfee Oil Company, a Shell oil distributor. He led McAfee Oil until he sold the company 30 years later.

The brother with him whom he started the oil company, Wes McAfee, had also played football for Duke before being drafted to play in the NFL. Wes played only a single NFL season until he too volunteered to serve in WWII.

According to his obituaries, McAfee rarely spoke of his football exploits after he retired from the sport, but frequently attended Duke athletic events for many years.

McAfee developed dementia in his later years and moved into Cypress Court, an assisted living facility specializing in Alzheimer's and memory care in Decatur, Georgia, owned and operated by Seattle-based Emeritus Senior Living. In February 2009, McAfee died from chemical burns after drinking a toxic substance that had not been properly locked up. The State of Georgia found Emeritus negligent in McAfee's death. The circumstances surrounding McAfee's death were featured in the 2013 PBS Frontline documentary "Life and Death in Assisted Living".
