= KCNB =

- Chadron, Nebraska; United States
- Frequency: 94.7 MHz
- Branding: B94.7

Programming
- Format: Top 40

Ownership
- Owner: Eagle Communications

Technical information
- Licensing authority: FCC
- Facility ID: 164168
- Class: C1
- ERP: 100,000 watts
- HAAT: 144 meters
- Transmitter coordinates: 42°39′5.10″N 102°41′49.30″W

Links
- Public license information: Public file; LMS

KCNB (94.7 FM, B94.7) is a radio station broadcasting a Top 40 music format. Licensed to Chadron, Nebraska, United States. The station is currently owned by Eagle Communications.
