= Chadron Commercial Historic District =

Historic district in Nebraska, United States

- U.S. National Register of Historic Places
- U.S. Historic district
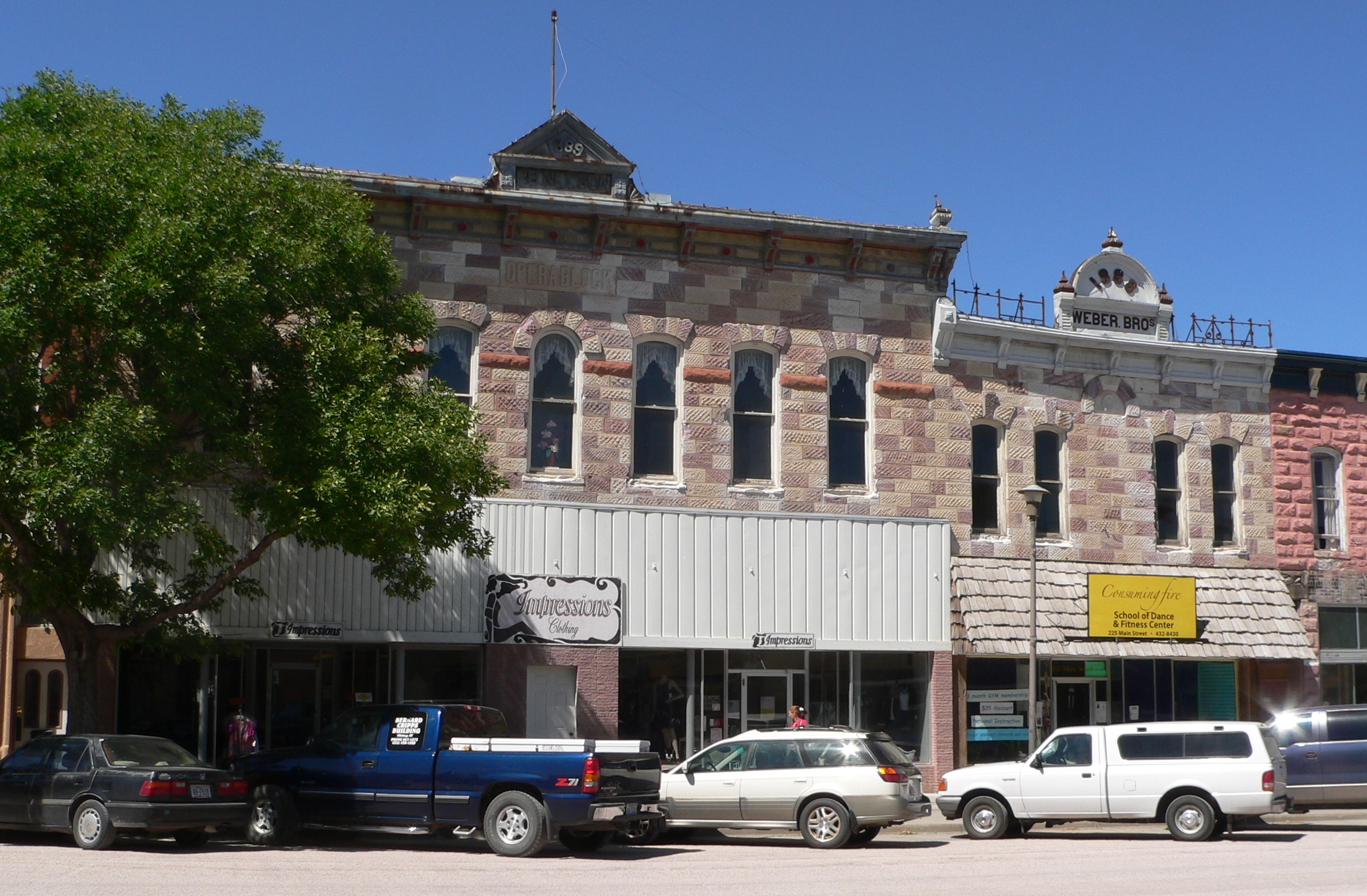

- Location within Nebraska Location within the United States
- Location: Main St. & 2nd St., Chadron, Nebraska
- Area: 12.9 acres (5.2 ha)
- Built: 1888
- Architectural style: Romanesque, Colonial Revival
- NRHP reference No.: 06001059
- Added to NRHP: March 27, 2007

The Chadron Commercial Historic District, located at Main St. & 2nd St. in Chadron, Nebraska, is a 12.9-acre (5.2 ha) historic district that was listed on the National Register of Historic Places in 2007. It includes buildings dating from 1888 and includes Romanesque Revival, Colonial Revival, and commercial vernacular architecture in some of its 41 contributing buildings and 20 non-contributing buildings.

Its oldest buildings are several built in 1888, including 248 W. 2nd Street, 116 W. 2nd Street, 219 Main Street, 223 Main Street, Weber Bros: 225 Main Street, and P.B. Nelson: 229 Main Street, which are all contributing; its newest contributing buildings date from c.1950.

It includes the 1890-built Hotel Chadron, which is separately listed on the National Register.

Chadron was founded as a city in 1884, and grew rapidly as arrival of the Fremont, Elkhorn & Missouri Valley Railroad (FE & MV, a predecessor of the Chicago and North Western Railroad) was expected soon. It hit 3,000 population in two years and 5,500 by 1893, before dropping due to droughts and the Panic of 1893.

Its business district was "anchored by the intersection of Main and 2nd streets" and mostly consisted of commercial vernacular buildings; "the great number of late nineteenth and early twentieth century buildings remaining along Main Street, between 1st and 3rd Streets, and along 2nd Street, between Morehead and Bordeaux streets" are covered in the NRHP district. These are significant as they "are the buildings that housed the businesses that enabled Chadron to establish itself as, and then to service the surrounding region as, a prominent trade center."
