= Bordeaux Creek =

Stream in Dawes County, Nebraska, U.S.

Coordinates: 42.937478°N 102.987964°W

Bordeaux Creek is a stream in Dawes County, Nebraska, in the United States.

Bordeaux Creek was named for a French fur trader who settled there.

== See also ==
- Bordeaux Trading Post
- List of rivers of Nebraska
