= Horn, Nebraska =

Unincorporated community in Nebraska, U.S.

Coordinates: 42°45′46″N 103°26′38″W

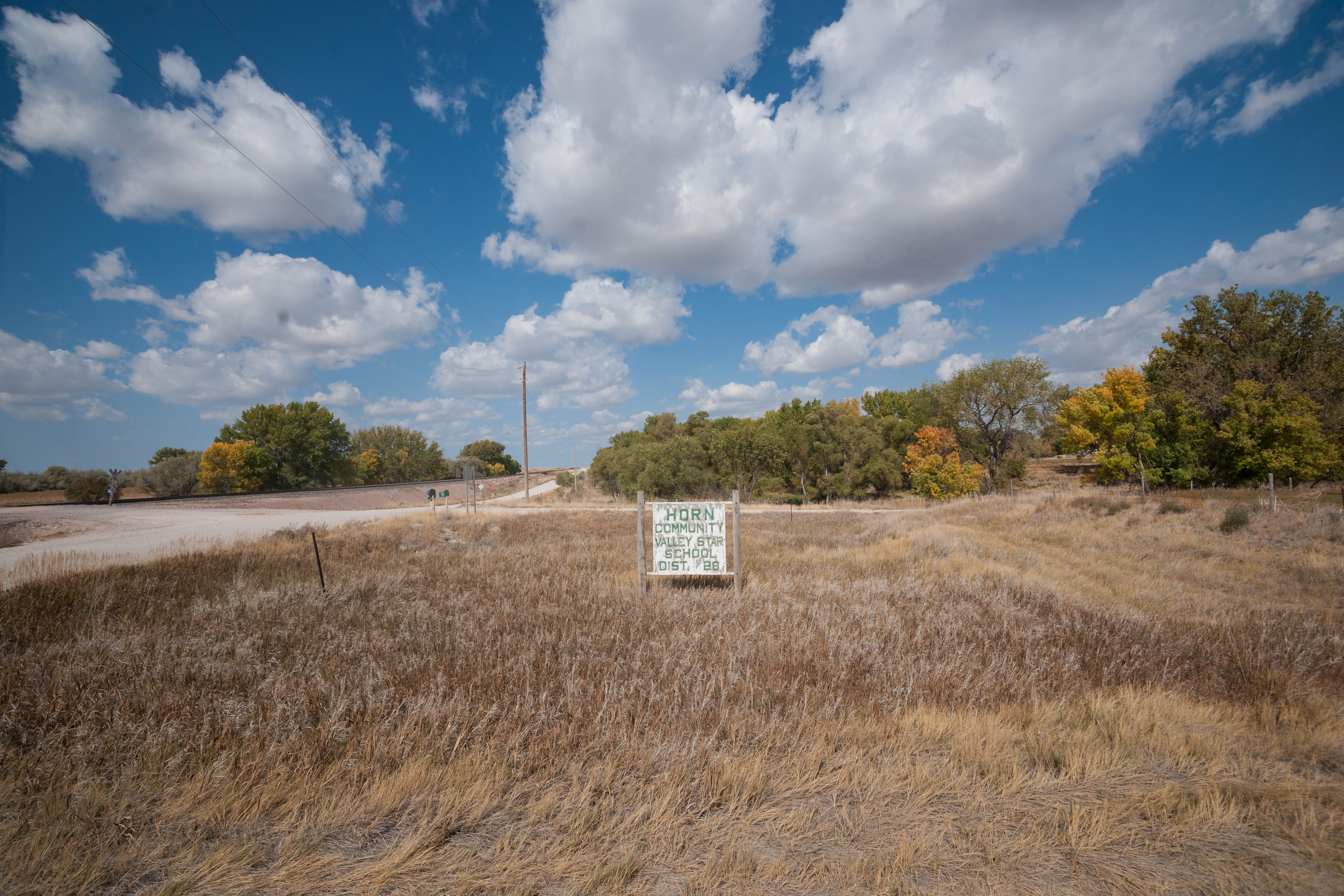
Horn, Nebraska, September 2012

Horn is an unincorporated community in Dawes County, Nebraska, United States.

== History ==
Horn was formerly called Remington. It was located on the Chicago, Burlington and Quincy Railroad.
