= KCOW =

Radio station in Alliance, Nebraska, United States

- Alliance, Nebraska; United States
- Frequency: 1400 kHz
- Branding: 1400 and 92.5 KCOW

Programming
- Format: Classic hits
- Affiliations: ABC News Radio; Westwood One

Ownership
- Owner: Eagle Communications, Inc.
- Sister stations: KAAQ, KQSK

History
- First air date: February 15, 1949

Technical information
- Licensing authority: FCC
- Facility ID: 18089
- Class: C
- Power: 1,000 watts
- Transmitter coordinates: 42°6′22″N 102°53′17″W
- Translator: 92.5 K223CY (Alliance)

Links
- Public license information: Public file; LMS
- Website: panhandlepost.com

KCOW (1400 kHz) is a radio station broadcasting a classic hits music format. It is licensed to Alliance, Nebraska, United States. The station is currently owned by Eagle Communications, Inc. and features programming from ABC News Radio and Westwood One.

Previous logo
