= Joel Rickenbach =

American politician

Member of the South Dakota House of Representatives
- In office 1975–1984

Personal details
- Born: November 12, 1918 Hot Springs, South Dakota, U.S.
- Died: November 8, 2003 (aged 84)
- Party: Republican
- Education: Chadron State College

Joel Rickenbach (November 12, 1918 – November 8, 2003) was an American politician. He served as a Republican member of the South Dakota House of Representatives.

== Life and career ==
Rickenbach was born in Hot Springs, South Dakota. He attended Chadron State College.

Rickenbach served in the South Dakota House of Representatives from 1975 to 1984.

Rickenbach died on November 8, 2003, at the age of 84.
