= Milt Trost =

American football player (1913–1986)

- Milt Trost, 1934

Profile
- Position: Tackle

Personal information
- Born: March 4, 1913; Detroit, Michigan
- Died: April 2, 1986 (aged 73); Zephyrhills, Florida
- Listed height: 6 ft 1 in (1.85 m)
- Listed weight: 206 lb (93 kg)

Career information
- College: Marquette (1931-1934)

Career history
- Chicago Bears (1935–1939); Philadelphia Eagles (1940); Camp Grant (1943)

Career statistics
- Games played: 53

Milton Frank Trost (March 4, 1913 – April 2, 1986) was an American football player. He was a lineman who played at the tackle position for Marquette University from 1931 to 1934 and in the National Football League (NFL) for the Chicago Bears (1935-1939) and Philadelphia Eagles (1940).

Trost was born in Detroit, Michigan, in 1913. He attended Washington High School in Milwaukee, Wisconsin. He then enrolled at Marquette University where he played college football for the Marquette Golden Avalanche football teams of 1931, 1932, 1933, and 1934.

Trost played professional football at the tackle position for the Chicago Bears for five years from 1935 to 1939. He appeared in 44 games for the Bears, principally as a backup to the Bears' Hall of Fame tackle Joe Stydahar.

On February 15, 1940, Trost and Russ Thompson were traded to the Philadelphia Eagles for future Pro Football Hall of Famer George McAfee and Joe Mihal. At 244 pounds, Trost was the second heaviest player on the Eagles' roster in 1940. He appeared in seven games for the Eagles and was released in November 1940.

After his release by the Eagles, Trost signed with the Newark Bears of the American Association, finishing the 1940 season there. He also played for the Milwaukee Chiefs of the American Football League during the 1941 season. During World War II, Trost served in the U.S. Army and played for the 1943 Camp Grant Warriors football team.

Trost died in 1986 in Broward County, Florida.
