= KAAQ =

- Alliance, Nebraska; United States
- Frequency: 105.9 MHz

Programming
- Format: Country music
- Affiliations: ABC Radio

Ownership
- Owner: Eagle Communications, Inc.
- Sister stations: KCOW, KQSK

History
- First air date: September 30, 1985

Technical information
- Licensing authority: FCC
- Facility ID: 18090
- Class: C1
- ERP: 100,000 watts
- HAAT: 215.0 meters
- Transmitter coordinates: 41°50′29″N 103°5′7″W

Links
- Public license information: Public file; LMS
- Website: doubleqcountry.com

KAAQ (105.9 FM) is a radio station broadcasting a country music format. Licensed to Alliance, Nebraska, United States, the station is currently owned by Eagle Communications, Inc. and features programming from ABC Radio .
