= Dawes County Courthouse =

- U.S. National Register of Historic Places
- U.S. Historic district
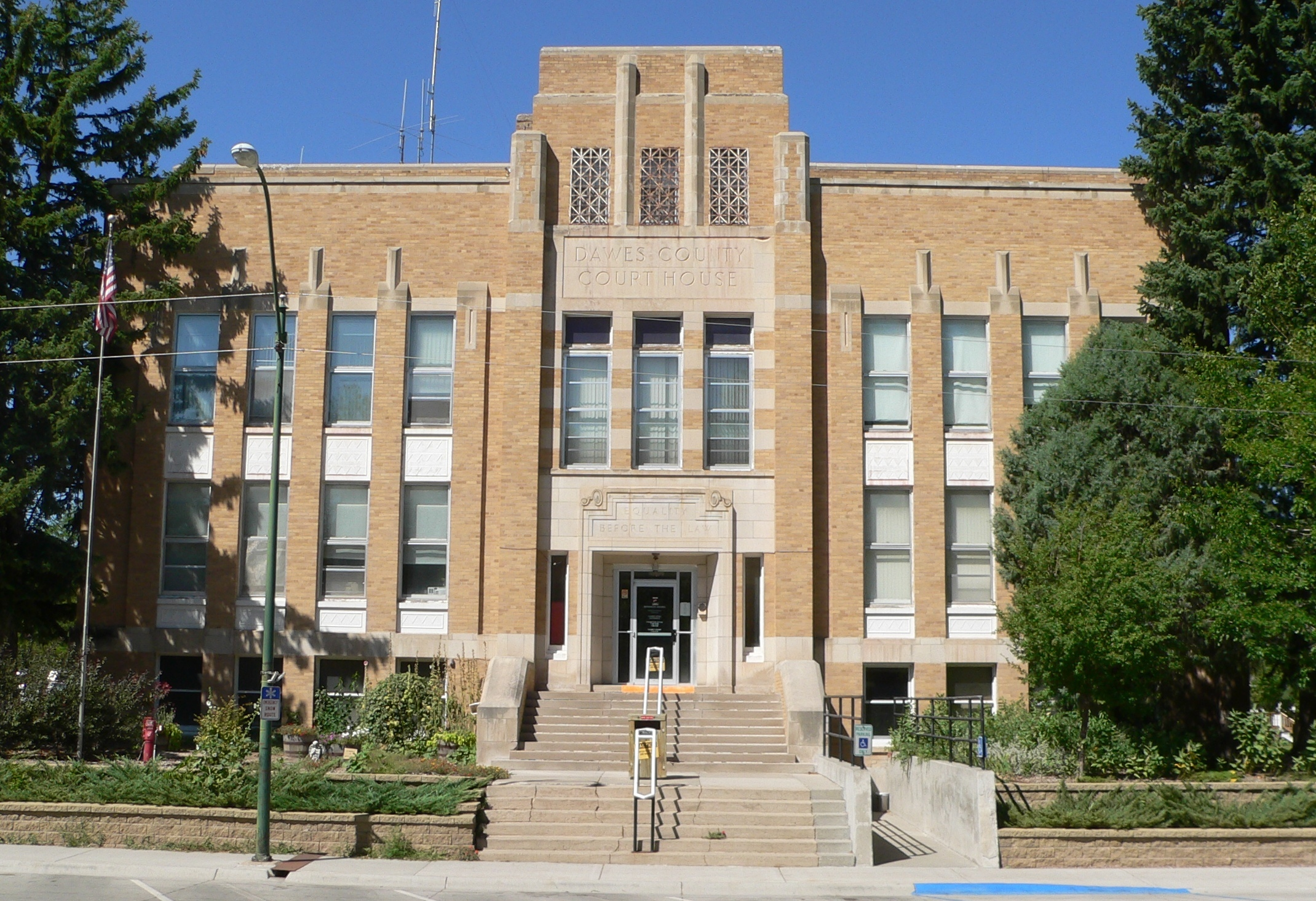

- Location within Nebraska Location within the United States
- Location: S. Main St. between 4th and 5th Sts., Chadron, Nebraska
- Coordinates: 42°49′57″N 103°19′51″W
- Area: 2.5 acres (1.0 ha)
- Built: 1935
- Architect: John Latenser & SonS
- Architectural style: Art Deco
- MPS: County Courthouses of Nebraska NPS
- NRHP reference No.: 90000975
- Added to NRHP: July 5, 1990

The Dawes County Courthouse in Chadron, Nebraska, United States, was built in 1935. It was designed in Art Deco style by John Latenser & Sons It is the courthouse of Dawes County, Nebraska.

Located on S. Main St. between 4th and 5th Sts. in Chadron, it was listed on the National Register of Historic Places in 1995; the listing included the courthouse building and two contributing objects. It is located at the end of the courthouse square it overlooks, because it was built as a replacement for an older, centered courthouse that remained in use during construction, and which only later was removed.
