= Janie Park =

American biologist (1946–2023)

Janie C. Park
- Park from a 1985 newspaper
- Born: Janie Clarice Fife; July 9, 1946; El Paso, Texas
- Died: June 27, 2023 (aged 76); Billings, Montana
- Education: Baylor University; Florida Institute of Technology
- Occupation(s): Biologist, college professor, college president
- Scientific career
- Fields: Biology
- Thesis: Comparative actions of streptomycin and gentamicin in the chick: systemic effects, behavioral changes and ampullary cytopathology (1982)

Janie Clarice Fife Park (July 9, 1946 – June 27, 2023) was an American biologist. She served as the 10th president of Chadron State College in Nebraska from 2005 to 2012.

== Early life and education ==
Janie Clarice Fife was born in El Paso, Texas, the daughter of Jim K. Fife and Irene Fife. She trained as a nurse at Baylor University. From the Florida Institute of Technology, she received a master's degree in immunology and a Doctor of Philosophy in biology. Her doctoral dissertation was completed in 1982 and titled, Comparative actions of streptomycin and gentamicin in the chick: systemic effects, behavioral changes and ampullary cytopathology.

== Career ==
Park worked as a nurse as a young woman. She was an associate professor of biology and associate dean at Florida Institute of Technology for three years. She joined the faculty of Eastern Montana College (now Montana State University Billings) in 1993, and taught biology there for three years before she was named provost and academic vice chancellor of the school. After nine years in leadership at Billings, she became the 10th president of Chadron State College in Nebraska in 2005. Her tenure as president included the school's centennial, and a wildfire that threatened the campus. She retired in 2012.

== Publications ==
Though she was best known as a college administrator, Park had a substantial research career in biology, studying ototoxicity. While at Florida Tech, she was research director of Electron Microscopy Services, and research director of the Center for Interdisciplinary Research in Aging. She held a grant from the National Institutes of Health. Her research was published in journals including American Journal of Otolaryngology, Acta Oto-Laryngologica, Florida Scientist, ORL, and Hearing Research.

- "Vestibular ototoxicity in the chick: Effects of streptomycin on equilibrium and on ampullary dark cells" (1982, with Glenn M. Cohen)
- "Glutaraldehyde Fixatives for Preserving the Chick's Inner Ear" (1984, with Glenn M. Cohen)
- "A New Method for Improved Fixation of the Chick's Inner Ear" (1984, with Joseph V. Otto, Cesar D. Fermin, and Glenn M. Cohen)
- "Further observations of vestibular ototoxicity in the chick: Effects of streptomycin on the ampullary sensory epithelium" (1984, with Glenn M. Cohen)
- "Impairment of the Chick’s Grip and Balance by Streptomycin: A Preliminary Study" (1985, with Glenn M. Cohen)
- "Morphometric analysis and fine structure of the vestibular epithelium of aged C57BL/6NNia mice" (1987, with Scott B. Hubel and Albert D. Woods)
- "Volume fraction and ultrastructure of age pigment in the saccular epithelium of old mice" (1989, with Scott B. Hubel)
- "Dietary restriction slows the abnormally rapid loss of spiral ganglion neurons in C57BL/6 mice" (1990, with Kenneth C. Cook and E. Alan Verde)
- "Cholinesterase activity in vestibular organs of young and old mice" (1992, with William T. McLamb)

== Personal life ==
Fife married financial consultant Tom Park; they had two sons. She died in 2023, at the age of 76, in Billings, Montana.
