= Joe Mihal =

American football player (1916–1979)

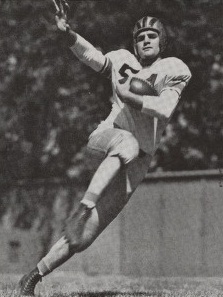

No. 27, 47, 43
- Position: Tackle

Personal information
- Born: April 2, 1916; Homestead, Pennsylvania, U.S.
- Died: September 18, 1979 (aged 63); Dallas, Texas, U.S.
- Listed height: 6 ft 2 in (1.88 m)
- Listed weight: 234 lb (106 kg)

Career information
- High school: Emerson (IN)
- College: Purdue (1935–1938)
- NFL draft: 1939: 3rd round, 19th overall pick

Career history
- Chicago Bears (1940–1941); Los Angeles Dons (1946); Chicago Rockets (1947)

Awards and highlights
- 2× NFL champion (1940–1941); 2× Pro Bowl (1940–1941); First-team All-Big Ten (1938)

Career NFL + AAFC statistics
- Games played: 33
- Starts: 1
- Stats at Pro Football Reference

Joseph Mihal (April 2, 1916 – September 18, 1979) was an American professional football player who was a tackle in the National Football League (NFL) for two seasons with the Chicago Bears. He was elected as a starter for the 1939 Chicago College All-Star Game. He was selected by the Philadelphia Eagles in the third round of the 1939 NFL draft.

Mihal as a member of the Los Angeles Dons in 1946.

On February 15, 1940, Mihal and George McAfee were traded to the Bears for Russ Thompson and Milt Trost. Mihal played for the Bears in their 73–0 victory over the Washington Redskins in the 1940 NFL Championship Game. He served in World War II for the United States Army.
