= Jennifer L. Green =

American statistics educator

Jennifer L. Green is an American scholar of statistics education and an associate professor in the Department of Statistics & Probability and Program in Mathematics Education at Michigan State University. Her research involves the teaching of statistics from elementary school to the undergraduate level, and the preparation of graduate students to become statistics teachers.

== Education and career ==
Green studied to become a mathematics teacher at Chadron State College in Nebraska, where she graduated summa cum laude in 2004. She continued her studies at the University of Nebraska–Lincoln in its Department of Statistics and Center for Science, Mathematics, and Computer Education; there, she received a master's degree in statistics in 2006 and a Ph.D. in 2010. Her dissertation, Estimating Teacher Effects using Value-added Models, was supervised by Erin Blankenship.

She joined Montana State University as an assistant professor in the Department of Mathematical Sciences in 2013, and was promoted to associate professor in 2018. She moved to her present position at Michigan State University in 2020.

== Recognition ==
Chadron State College gave Green their 2020 Distinguished Young Alumni Award. She was elected as a Fellow of the American Statistical Association in the 2026 class of fellows.
