= KQSK =

Radio station in Chadron, Nebraska

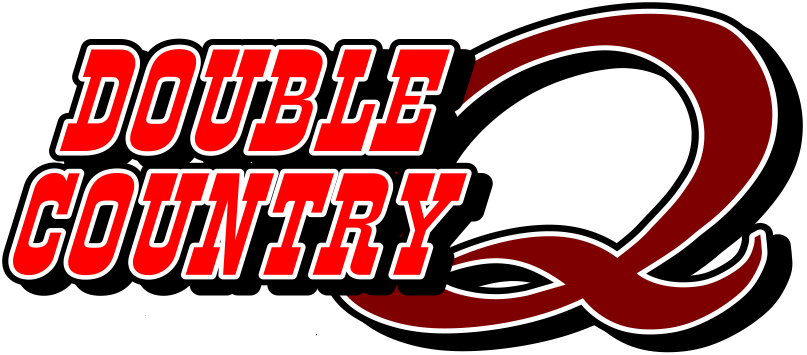
- Chadron, Nebraska; United States
- Broadcast area: Nebraska Panhandle
- Frequency: 97.5 MHz

Programming
- Language: English
- Format: Country music
- Affiliations: ABC Radio

Ownership
- Owner: Eagle Communications, Inc.
- Sister stations: KAAQ; KCOW

History
- First air date: September 15, 1979

Technical information
- Licensing authority: FCC
- Facility ID: 18091
- Class: C1
- ERP: 100,000 watts
- HAAT: 255 meters (837 ft)

Links
- Public license information: Public file; LMS
- Website: doubleqcountry.com

KQSK (97.5 MHz) is a commercial country music radio station in northwest Nebraska. It is licensed to Chadron, Nebraska. It is owned by Eagle Communications, Inc., and licensee held by Double Q Country.

It simulcasts KAAQ FM 105.9 in Alliance, Nebraska.
