= Henry Wohlers Sr. Homestead =

- Wohlers, Henry Sr. Homestead
- U.S. National Register of Historic Places
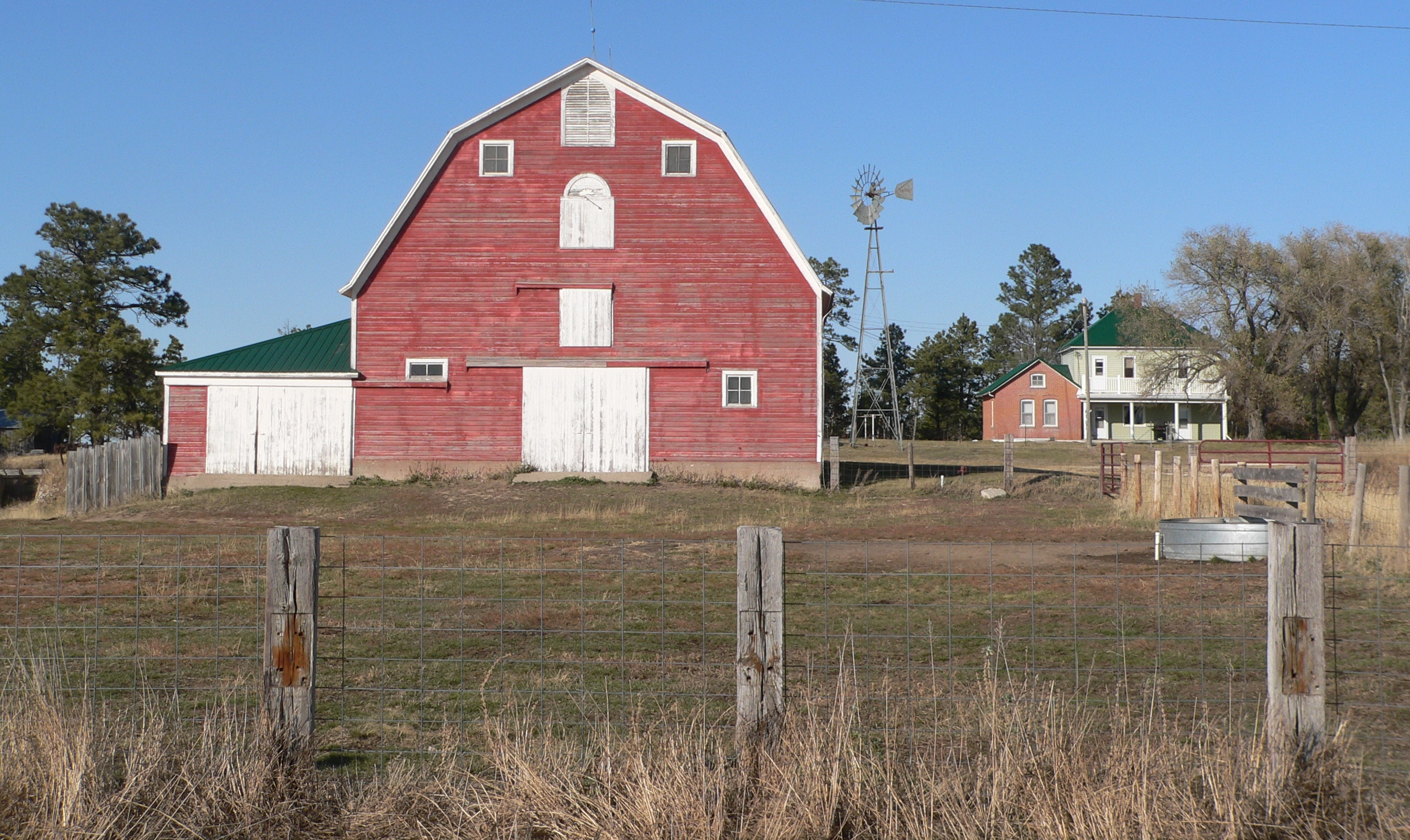

- Location within Nebraska Location within the United States
- Nearest city: Crawford, Nebraska
- Area: 4 acres (1.6 ha)
- Built: c. 1890, 1910, 1914
- Built by: Starks, Charles
- Architectural style: Prairie School
- NRHP reference No.: 04000800
- Added to NRHP: October 15, 2004

The Henry Wohlers Sr. Homestead, also known as "Dutch Henry" Wohlers Homestead, was listed on the National Register of Historic Places in 2004. The property includes four contributing buildings and one other contributing structure.

It includes a brick house built c. 1890, a two-story addition built in 1910, and a barn built in 1914. It also includes a washhouse, a chicken coop, and a windmill.

In 2010, the property was operated as Pine Ridge Hunting and Lodging.
