= Bordeaux Trading Post =

- U.S. National Register of Historic Places
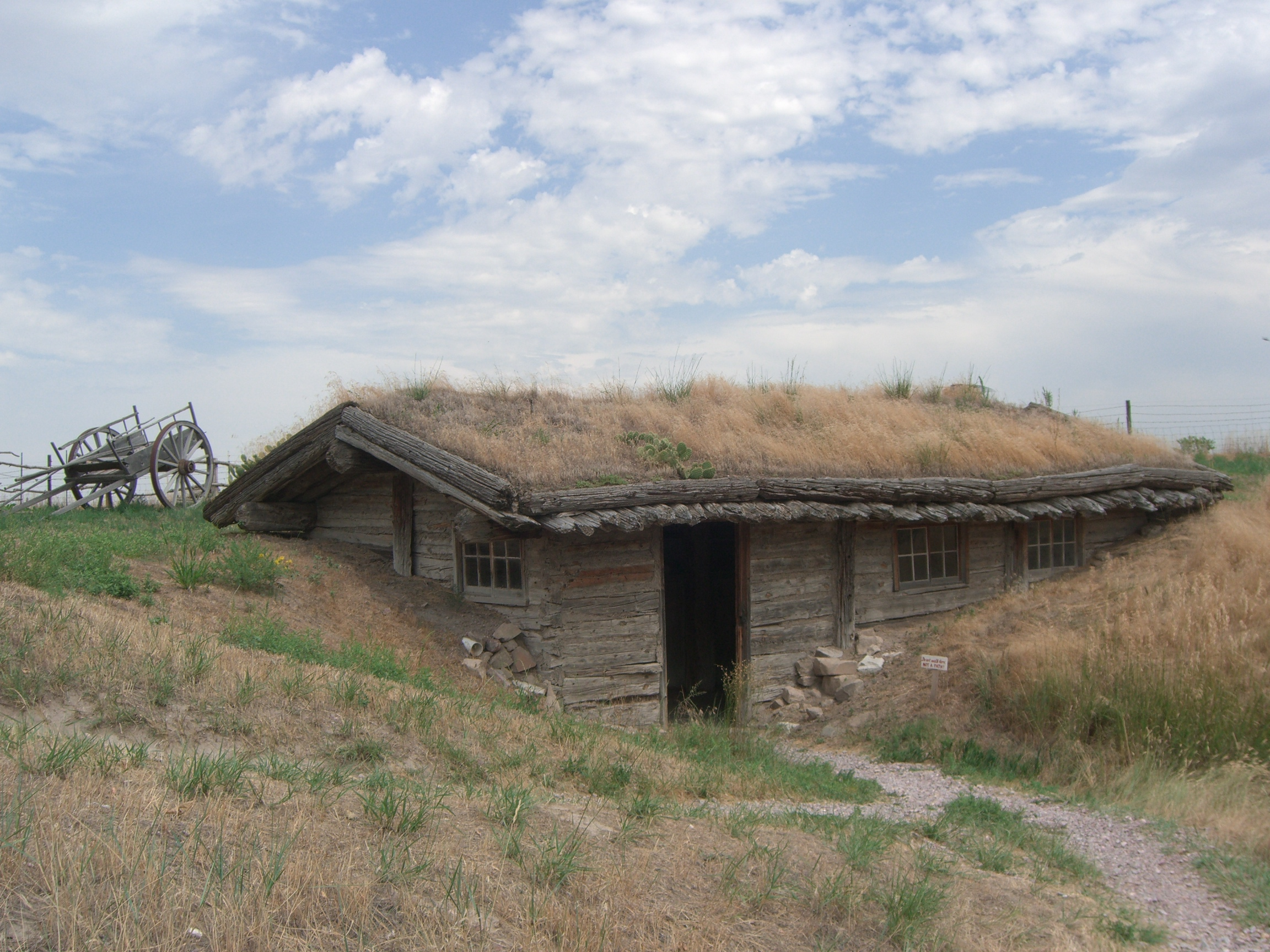
- Reconstruction, at Museum of the Fur Trade

- Location within Nebraska Location within the United States
- Location: Three miles east of Chadron on U.S. 20
- Nearest city: Chadron, Nebraska
- Coordinates: 42°49′25″N 102°55′27″W
- Area: 1.5 acres (0.61 ha)
- Built: 1846
- NRHP reference No.: 72000746
- Added to NRHP: March 16, 1972

The Bordeaux Trading Post near Chadron, Nebraska was built during 1845–46 by James Bordeaux. It has been reconstructed faithfully, in the same location with the same post-holes, using weathered old lumber from a nearby ranchhouse. It is now the Museum of the Fur Trade.

In 1972 the post was listed as an archeological site, with potential for information to be gleaned in the future, on the National Register of Historic Places.

== History ==
James Bordeaux's trading post is located on the museum grounds. Reconstructed in 1956 on its original foundation stones and formally opened, the reconstructed storehouse followed soon after. The precise location of the post, by the 1950s a large sloping depression on a natural terrace a few yards from Bordeaux Creek, had been conclusively identified by eyewitnesses including Hudson Mead, the first county surveyor, and Welcome Naylor, son of the first homesteader on Bordeaux Creek. Both had seen the collapsing ruins in the 1880s. Most amazing, however, were the recollections of Herbert and John Bissonette, the sons of fur trader Joseph Bissonette who was a competitor and contemporary of Bordeaux. During the 1870s Joseph had operated a trading post less than a mile away, and both brothers had visited the Bordeaux post on countless occasions when it was still in business. The brothers' descriptions of the Bordeaux post interior, with details of shelves, counters, window locations, and furnishings were important details that were often corroborated by the archeological record.

Although the walls and the stumps of the upright supports were clearly revealed during the excavations, all wood components of the structures had deteriorated beyond any possibility of reuse. Early settlers had even removed the easily accessible stones from the chimney. However, the hearthstones of the fireplace and the threshold stones in the entry are the original ones laid down in 1837 and found in place in 1956. The walls, of hand-hewn native timber, follow the exact alignment of the originals, and all supporting uprights are sized to match the originals and are reset in the original postholes. The reconstruction is included in the National Register of Historic Places, a rare honor for any rebuilt structure.

The trading post itself was established in the fall of 1837 on orders of Frederick Laboue, a trader for the American Fur Company and known to the Sioux as “Grey Eyes.” The company had just purchased Fort Laramie, a hundred miles (160 km) southwest, from William Sublette, and Laboue was anxious to maximize its trade in prime buffalo robes by establishing satellite posts in the protected valleys where the Indians wintered. As post manager, Laboue selected Jim Bordeaux, a Missouri Frenchman called “The Bear” by the Indians. He was married to two Brulé Sioux sisters whose brother, Swift Bear, was chief of the Corn Band.

The army bought Fort Laramie from the fur company during the California Gold Rush of 1849. In that year Bordeaux went into business for himself. Enemy Crow Indians from Montana raided his post on Bordeaux Creek. Friendly Sioux under Red Leaf and Two Strikes pursued the war party and fought an inconclusive battle 25 miles (40 km) west at Crow Butte, named in honor of the fight.

Bordeaux prospered and eventually operated a store and ranch near Fort Laramie and a stock ranch on Chugwater Creek in Wyoming. He served as an interpreter at the Fort Laramie Treaty of 1868. His son, Louis, often ran the Bordeaux Creek post in later years. After the American Civil War, conditions on the Northern Plains were unsettled and the trade often degenerated into the supplying of contraband arms to Indians resisting government efforts to force them onto reservations. In 1872 Jim Bordeaux abandoned his western interests and moved to Fort Randall on the Missouri, where he had several government contracts to supply hay, firewood, and other services to the army. He died of pneumonia in 1878 at 64 years of age.

Immediately after Bordeaux left, Francis Boucher, son-in-law of Spotted Tail, head chief of the Brulé Sioux, occupied the post on Bordeaux Creek. Probably with the tacit support of Spotted Tail, Boucher, known as “Bushy” to the Indians, played a dangerous game of smuggling arms and ammunition to the warriors fighting against the army. Undoubtedly guns and cartridges from this post figured in the defeats of Generals Custer and Crook. Finally, in August 1876, army troopers caught Boucher with 40,000 rounds of ammunition and put him out of business. The next year, the last free Indians crossed into Canada or surrendered and were moved to permanent reservations. The post on Bordeaux Creek had fallen into ruins by the time the railroad and the first homesteaders reached the Pine Ridge in 1885.

An official state historical marker detailing the history of the Bordeaux Trading post was placed on the museum grounds in 1967. The Chadron Area Chamber of Commerce provided funds for its erection. Edgar Red Cloud, grandson of old chief Red Cloud, delivered the benediction and sang the Sioux national anthem.

== See also ==
- Grattan massacre to which Bordeaux was a witness
