= Nonlinear modelling =

Type of mathematical model

In mathematics, nonlinear modelling is empirical or semi-empirical modelling which takes at least some nonlinearities into account. Nonlinear modelling in practice therefore means modelling of phenomena in which independent variables affecting the system can show complex and synergetic nonlinear effects. Contrary to traditional modelling methods, such as linear regression and basic statistical methods, nonlinear modelling can be utilized efficiently in a vast number of situations where traditional modelling is impractical or impossible. The newer nonlinear modelling approaches include non-parametric methods, such as feedforward neural networks, kernel regression, multivariate splines, etc., which do not require a prior knowledge of the nonlinearities in the relations. Thus the nonlinear modelling can utilize production data or experimental results while taking into account complex nonlinear behaviours of modelled phenomena which are in most cases practically impossible to be modelled by means of traditional mathematical approaches, such as phenomenological modelling.

Contrary to phenomenological modelling, nonlinear modelling can be utilized in processes and systems where the theory is deficient or there is a lack of fundamental understanding on the root causes of most crucial factors on system. Phenomenological modelling describes a system in terms of laws of nature. Nonlinear modelling can be utilized in situations where the phenomena are not well understood or expressed in mathematical terms. Thus nonlinear modelling can be an efficient way to model new and complex situations where relationships of different variables are not known.
