= Dawes County, Nebraska =

County in Nebraska, United States

- County
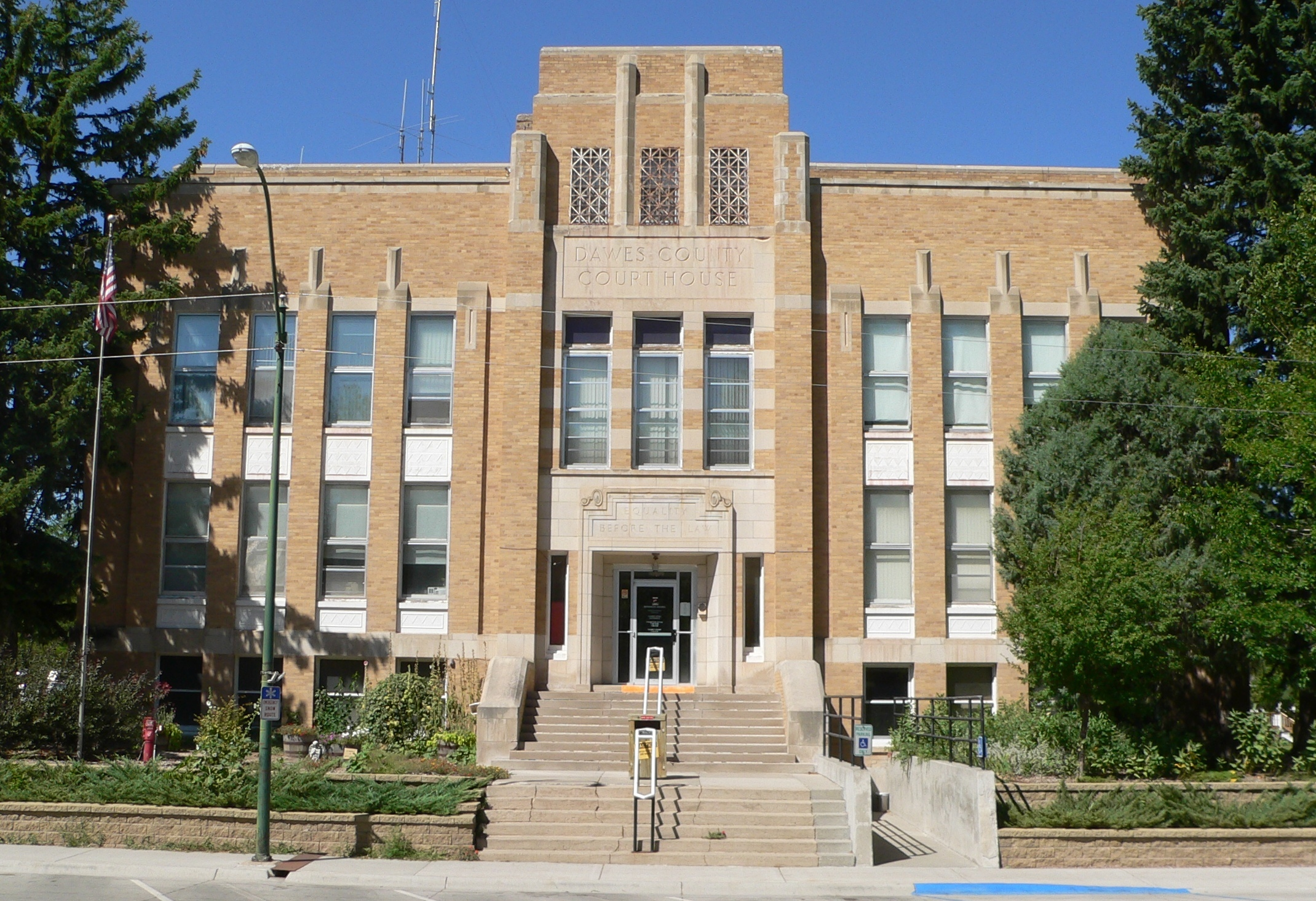
- The Dawes County Courthouse in Chadron

- Location within the U.S. state of Nebraska
- Coordinates: 42.713038°N 103.135436°W
- Country: United States
- State: Nebraska
- Founded: February 19, 1885
- Named for: James W. Dawes
- Seat: Chadron
- Largest city: Chadron

Area
  - Total: 1,400.976 sq mi (3,628.51 km^{2})
  - Land: 1,396.437 sq mi (3,616.76 km^{2})
  - Water: 4.539 sq mi (11.76 km^{2}) 0.32%

Population (2020)
  - Total: 8,199
  - Estimate (2025): 7,858 ▼
  - Density: 5.871/sq mi (2.267/km^{2})
- Time zone: UTC−7 (Mountain)
  - Summer (DST): UTC−6 (MDT)
- Area code: 308
- Congressional district: 3rd
- Website: dawescounty.ne.gov
- • Nebraska county number 23 • Nebraska license plate prefix 69

Dawes County is a county in the U.S. state of Nebraska. As of the 2020 census, the population was 8,199, and was estimated to be 7,858 in 2025. The county seat and the largest city is Chadron.

In the Nebraska license plate system, Dawes County was represented by the prefix "69" (as it had the 69th-largest number of vehicles registered in the state when the license plate system was established in 1922).

== History ==
Dawes County was created on February 19, 1885; it was named for James W. Dawes, the Nebraska Governor at the time.

Dawes County was a part of the unorganized area of northwestern Nebraska until February 19, 1877, when it became a part of Sioux County from which it was separated February 19, 1885, and was given its present name.

== Geography ==
According to the United States Census Bureau, the county has a total area of 1,400.976 square miles (3,628.51 km^{2}), of which 1,396.437 square miles (3,616.76 km^{2}) is land and 4.539 square miles (11.76 km^{2}) (0.32%) is water. It is the 9th-largest county in Nebraska by total area.

Dawes County lies on the north border of Nebraska. Its north boundary line abuts the south boundary line of the state of South Dakota.

Since it lies in the western part of Nebraska, Dawes County residents observe Mountain Time. The eastern two-thirds of the state observes Central Time.

=== Major highways ===
- US 20
- US 385
- US 20
- Nebraska Highway 2
- Nebraska Highway 71

=== Transit ===
- Chadron City Transit

=== Adjacent counties ===
- Oglala Lakota County, South Dakota - northeast
- Sheridan County - east
- Box Butte County - south
- Sioux County - west
- Fall River County, South Dakota - northwest

=== National protected areas ===
- Nebraska National Forest (part)
- Pine Ridge National Recreation Area
- Oglala National Grassland (part)

=== State protected areas ===
- Box Butte Reservoir State Recreation Area
- Chadron State Park
- Fort Robinson State Park (part)
- Chadron Creek Ranch State Wildlife Management Area
- Bordeaux State Wildlife Management Area
- Bighorn State Wildlife Management Area
- Ponderosa State Wildlife Management Area

== Demographics ==
Historical population
Census	Pop.	Note	%±
1890	9,722		—
1900	6,215		−36.1%
1910	8,254		32.8%
1920	10,160		23.1%
1930	11,493		13.1%
1940	10,128		−11.9%
1950	9,708		−4.1%
1960	9,536		−1.8%
1970	9,761		2.4%
1980	9,609		−1.6%
1990	9,021		−6.1%
2000	9,060		0.4%
2010	9,182		1.3%
2020	8,199		−10.7%
2025 (est.)	7,858	▼	−4.2%
U.S. Decennial Census; 1790–1960 1900–1990; 1990–2000 2010–2020

=== 2020 census ===
As of the 2020 census, the county had a population of 8,199. The median age was 36.7 years. 19.9% of residents were under the age of 18 and 19.4% of residents were 65 years of age or older. For every 100 females there were 95.6 males, and for every 100 females age 18 and over there were 94.9 males age 18 and over.

The racial makeup of the county was 86.2% White, 2.0% Black or African American, 4.2% American Indian and Alaska Native, 0.6% Asian, 0.1% Native Hawaiian and Pacific Islander, 1.5% from some other race, and 5.4% from two or more races. Hispanic or Latino residents of any race comprised 4.0% of the population.

60.1% of residents lived in urban areas, while 39.9% lived in rural areas.

There were 3,325 households in the county, of which 24.8% had children under the age of 18 living with them and 26.6% had a female householder with no spouse or partner present. About 35.2% of all households were made up of individuals and 15.2% had someone living alone who was 65 years of age or older.

There were 4,002 housing units, of which 16.9% were vacant. Among occupied housing units, 63.2% were owner-occupied and 36.8% were renter-occupied. The homeowner vacancy rate was 3.0% and the rental vacancy rate was 9.1%.

=== 2000 census ===
As of the 2000 census, there were 9,060 people, 3,512 households, and 2,086 families in the county. The population density was 6 people per square mile (2.3 people/km^{2}). There were 4,004 housing units at an average density of 3 units per square mile (1.2/km^{2}). The racial makeup of the county was 93.34% White, 0.81% Black or African American, 2.88% Native American, 0.31% Asian, 0.06% Pacific Islander, 1.03% from other races, and 1.58% from two or more races. 2.43% of the population were Hispanic or Latino of any race. 38.0% were of German, 9.9% English, 9.2% Irish and 7.4% American ancestry.

There were 3,512 households, out of which 26.20% had children under the age of 18 living with them, 48.50% were married couples living together, 7.90% had a female householder with no husband present, and 40.60% were non-families. 31.00% of all households were made up of individuals, and 12.90% had someone living alone who was 65 years of age or older. The average household size was 2.28 and the average family size was 2.87.

The county population contained 21.20% under the age of 18, 23.40% from 18 to 24, 20.40% from 25 to 44, 20.30% from 45 to 64, and 14.80% who were 65 years of age or older. The median age was 31 years. For every 100 females there were 95.60 males. For every 100 females age 18 and over, there were 91.10 males.

The median income for a household in the county was $29,476, and the median income for a family was $41,092. Males had a median income of $29,162 versus $17,404 for females. The per capita income for the county was $16,353. About 9.80% of families and 18.90% of the population were below the poverty line, including 14.40% of those under age 18 and 9.80% of those age 65 or over.

== Communities ==
=== Cities ===
- Chadron (county seat)
- Crawford

=== Village ===
- Whitney

=== Unincorporated communities ===
- Bordeaux
- Horn
- Marsland
- Pine Ridge

=== Ghost town ===
- Belmont

== Politics ==
Dawes County voters have been reliably Republican for decades; in no national election since 1936 has the county selected the Democratic Party candidate (as of 2024).

United States presidential election results for Dawes County, Nebraska
Year	Republican		Democratic		Third party(ies)	
Year	No.	%	No.	%	No.	%
1900	613	49.32%	587	47.22%	43	3.46%
1904	818	66.45%	247	20.06%	166	13.48%
1908	836	51.99%	727	45.21%	45	2.80%
1912	298	18.97%	583	37.11%	690	43.92%
1916	751	39.42%	1,088	57.11%	66	3.46%
1920	1,801	64.60%	900	32.28%	87	3.12%
1924	1,575	41.25%	595	15.58%	1,648	43.16%
1928	3,276	73.32%	1,173	26.25%	19	0.43%
1932	2,095	44.84%	2,457	52.59%	120	2.57%
1936	2,083	40.67%	2,784	54.35%	255	4.98%
1940	3,184	64.26%	1,771	35.74%	0	0.00%
1944	2,747	65.50%	1,447	34.50%	0	0.00%
1948	2,399	61.54%	1,499	38.46%	0	0.00%
1952	3,583	75.59%	1,157	24.41%	0	0.00%
1956	2,523	73.86%	893	26.14%	0	0.00%
1960	3,106	70.83%	1,279	29.17%	0	0.00%
1964	2,518	61.61%	1,569	38.39%	0	0.00%
1968	2,600	71.94%	741	20.50%	273	7.55%
1972	2,987	80.77%	711	19.23%	0	0.00%
1976	2,446	62.56%	1,286	32.89%	178	4.55%
1980	3,283	76.24%	705	16.37%	318	7.39%
1984	3,326	78.59%	865	20.44%	41	0.97%
1988	2,621	69.50%	1,123	29.78%	27	0.72%
1992	1,961	48.21%	987	24.26%	1,120	27.53%
1996	1,991	55.69%	1,108	30.99%	476	13.31%
2000	2,549	70.39%	823	22.73%	249	6.88%
2004	2,809	70.33%	1,119	28.02%	66	1.65%
2008	2,376	62.94%	1,285	34.04%	114	3.02%
2012	2,478	66.47%	1,132	30.36%	118	3.17%
2016	2,632	71.60%	801	21.79%	243	6.61%
2020	2,931	70.61%	1,082	26.07%	138	3.32%
2024	2,812	72.31%	992	25.51%	85	2.19%

== See also ==
- National Register of Historic Places listings in Dawes County, Nebraska
