= Pine Ridge, Dawes County, Nebraska =

Unincorporated community in Nebraska, U.S.

Coordinates: 42°29′40″N 103°28′20″W

Pine Ridge is an unincorporated community in Dawes County, Nebraska, United States.

== History ==
A post office was established at Pine Ridge in 1911, and remained in operation until it was discontinued in 1945. The community was named after Pine Ridge, a natural ridge covered with pine trees.
