= Chardon (ship) =

Whaling ship in late 1700s

History
- Name: Chardon (1787); Judith (1789)
- Owner: Aget, Kenny and Coffyn (1787); Benjamin Hussey (1789)
- Completed: 1787

General characteristics
- Type: Whaler
- Tonnage: 379 tons (of load)
- Tons burthen: 370 (bm)

Chardon was a whaler that Aget, Kenny, and Coffyn purchased in 1787 and commissioned at Dunkirk that same year. Benjamin Hussey purchased her in 1789 and renamed her Judith. Judith made four whaling voyages as a French ship. The British captured her but her crew recaptured her. She then sailed to New Bedford.

== Career ==
=== Whaling voyage #1 (1789–90) ===
Captain Isaiah Hussey sailed on 4 September 1789. He returned to port on 21 September 1790 with 1600 barrels of whale oil and 12,000 lbs of whalebone (baleen).

=== Whaling voyage #2 (1790) ===
Captain Micajah Gardner may have sailed her on a voyage that was cut short.

=== Whaling voyage #3 (1791–1792) ===
Reportedly, Captain Micajah Gardner sailed on 19 March 1791. However, Judith, of Dunkirk, Hussey, master, was reported "all well" at Walwich Bay on 11 September. She returned on 19 May 1792. Judith returned with 1200 barrels of whale oil 12,000 pounds of whale bone.

=== Whaling voyage #4 (1792–1793) ===
Captain Paul Ray sailed from Dunkirk in September 1792 for the whale fisheries of Walvis Bay. There the 20-gun armed whaler Liverpool captured her in July 1793, after the outbreak of the French Revolutionary Wars. Judith's own crew recaptured her; during the night Paul Ray, her captain, cut the cables to her anchor and sailed away. By August she was at New Bedford.

An American database of whaling voyages shows her master as Paul Ray, her homeport as Nantucket, and that she returned with 800 barrels of whale oil. It shows no subsequent whaling voyages for Judith. Judith had made earlier whaling voyages to Walvis Bay in 1790 and 1791; actually, Ray had been an officer aboard her since 1790, and her captain since 1792.

The outbreak of war in 1793 resulted in the capture of other French-registered whalers such as Phébé. In response, their owners transferred their operations and the registries of their vessels to Nantucket, New Bedford, London and, later, Milford Haven. Many of the masters, officers, and crewmembers of the vessels were already from these ports.

Note: Liverpool is largely a mystery. She does not appear in Lloyd's Register, nor in a listing of British letters of marque, nor in William's book on Liverpool privateers and slave traders. Rhys and du Pasquier also mention Liverpool and the capture of Judith, and that Liverpool, of Liverpool, was under the command of Captain Jonathan Fleming, that she had received a letter of marque, and that she was a "half whaler".
