= Phoebe A. Chardon =

American politician

Member of the New Hampshire House of Representatives from the Coos 4th district
- In office 1980–1982

Member of the New Hampshire House of Representatives from the Coos 6th district
- In office 1982–1986

Personal details
- Born: May 5, 1933
- Died: July 31, 2023 (aged 90)
- Party: Republican; Democratic
- Education: Vassar College

Phoebe A. Chardon (May 5, 1933 – July 31, 2023) was an American politician. She served as a member for the Coos 4th and 6th district of the New Hampshire House of Representatives.

== Life and career ==
Chardon attended Vassar College.

Chardon served in the New Hampshire House of Representatives from 1980 to 1986.

Chardon died on July 31, 2023, at the age of 90.
