= Whitney, Nebraska =

Village in Dawes County, Nebraska, United States

- Village
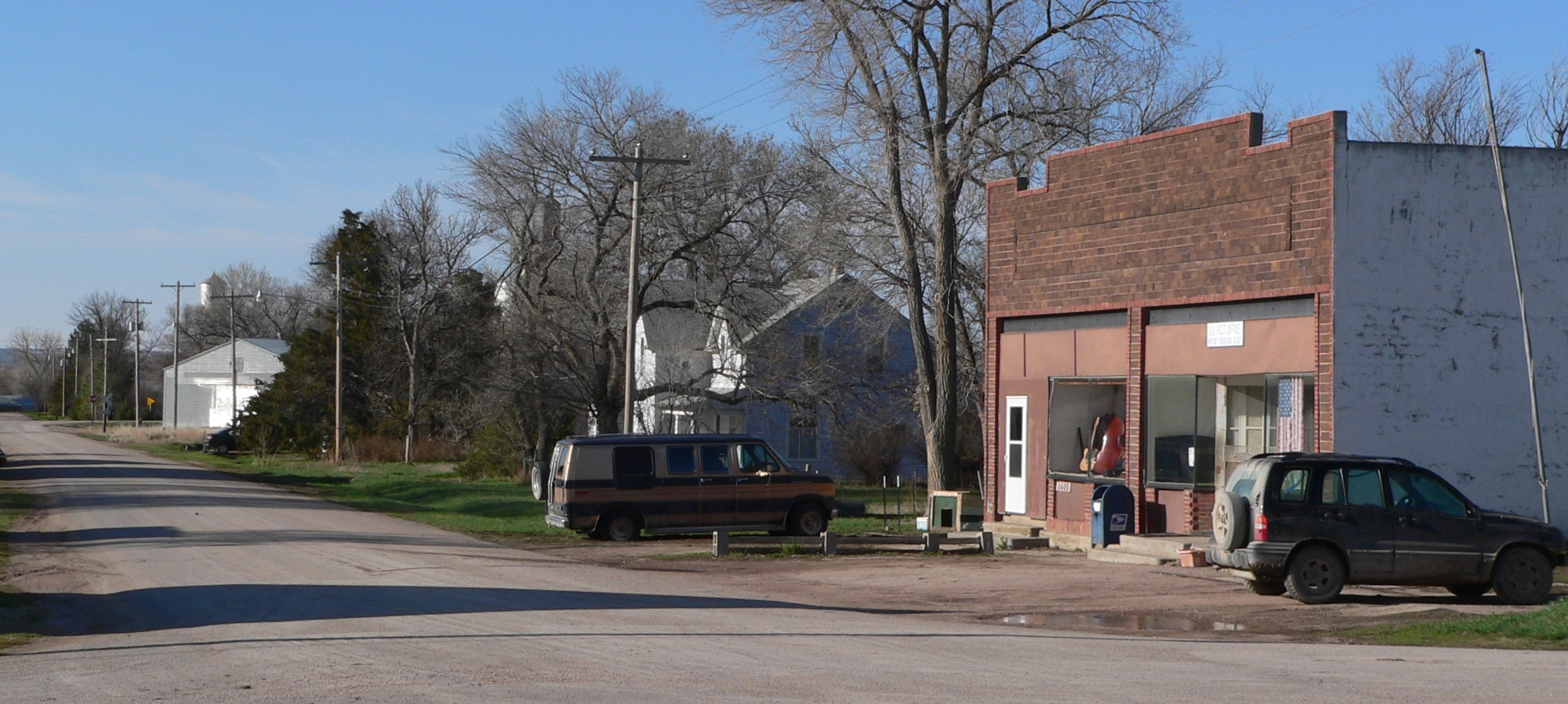
- Downtown Whitney, April 2011

- Location of Whitney, Nebraska
- Coordinates: 42°47′02″N 103°15′24″W
- Country: United States
- State: Nebraska
- County: Dawes

Area
  - Total: 0.16 sq mi (0.41 km^{2})
  - Land: 0.16 sq mi (0.41 km^{2})
  - Water: 0 sq mi (0.00 km^{2})
- Elevation: 3,412 ft (1,040 m)

Population (2020)
  - Total: 62
  - Density: 392.8/sq mi (151.67/km^{2})
- Time zone: UTC-7 (Mountain (MST))
  - Summer (DST): UTC-6 (MDT)
- ZIP code: 69367
- Area code: 308
- FIPS code: 31-52925
- GNIS feature ID: 2400167

Whitney is a village in Dawes County, Nebraska, United States. As of the 2020 census, Whitney had a population of 62.

== History ==
Originally called Dawes City, then Earth Lodge, it was renamed in honor of Peter Whitney, a railroad official. East of Whitney is the site of Old Fort Useless, built for settlers' protection but never used.

Whitney was incorporated as a village in 1888.

== Geography ==
According to the United States Census Bureau, the village has a total area of 0.16 square miles (0.41 km^{2}), all land.

== Demographics ==
Historical population
Census	Pop.	Note	%±
1930	177		—
1940	154		−13.0%
1950	132		−14.3%
1960	98		−25.8%
1970	82		−16.3%
1980	72		−12.2%
1990	38		−47.2%
2000	87		128.9%
2010	77		−11.5%
2020	62		−19.5%
U.S. Decennial Census

=== 2010 census ===
As of the census of 2010, there were 77 people, 37 households, and 25 families residing in the village. The population density was 481.3 inhabitants per square mile (185.8/km^{2}). There were 39 housing units at an average density of 243.8 per square mile (94.1/km^{2}). The racial makeup of the village was 88.3% White, 2.6% African American, 3.9% from other races, and 5.2% from two or more races. Hispanic or Latino of any race were 11.7% of the population.

There were 37 households, of which 21.6% had children under the age of 18 living with them, 56.8% were married couples living together, 8.1% had a female householder with no husband present, 2.7% had a male householder with no wife present, and 32.4% were non-families. 27.0% of all households were made up of individuals, and 13.5% had someone living alone who was 65 years of age or older. The average household size was 2.08 and the average family size was 2.44.

The median age in the village was 49.2 years. 16.9% of residents were under the age of 18; 7.8% were between the ages of 18 and 24; 15.6% were from 25 to 44; 33.8% were from 45 to 64; and 26% were 65 years of age or older. The gender makeup of the village was 49.4% male and 50.6% female.

=== 2000 census ===
As of the census of 2000, there were 87 people, 34 households, and 24 families residing in the village. The population density was 551.2 inhabitants per square mile (212.8/km^{2}). There were 40 housing units at an average density of 253.4 per square mile (97.8/km^{2}). The racial makeup of the village was 97.70% White, 2.30% from other races. Hispanic or Latino of any race were 2.30% of the population.

There were 34 households, out of which 32.4% had children under the age of 18 living with them, 55.9% were married couples living together, 11.8% had a female householder with no husband present, and 29.4% were non-families. 17.6% of all households were made up of individuals, and 11.8% had someone living alone who was 65 years of age or older. The average household size was 2.56 and the average family size was 2.92.

In the village, the population was spread out, with 28.7% under the age of 18, 4.6% from 18 to 24, 24.1% from 25 to 44, 24.1% from 45 to 64, and 18.4% who were 65 years of age or older. The median age was 39 years. For every 100 females, there were 102.3 males. For every 100 females age 18 and over, there were 106.7 males.

As of 2000 the median income for a household in the village was $28,333, and the median income for a family was $20,625. Males had a median income of $11,667 versus $10,625 for females. The per capita income for the village was $11,107. There were 22.2% of families and 13.7% of the population living below the poverty line, including 6.7% of under eighteens and none of those over 64.

== See also ==
- List of municipalities in Nebraska
- AN/URC-117 Ground Wave Emergency Network
