= Chadron Senior High School =

High school in Nebraska, United States

Coordinates: 42°49′20″N 102°59′39″W

Location
- 901 Cedar St. Chadron, Nebraska 69337; United States of America

Information
- Type: Public high school
- Motto: "Infinite Possibilities, Infinite Education" or "Chadron High Never Die"
- School district: Chadron Public Schools
- Principal: Jerry Mack
- Teaching staff: 23.75 (FTE)
- Grades: 9-12
- Enrollment: 253 (2023-2024)
- Student to teacher ratio: 10.65
- Colors: Scarlet and black
- Mascot: Cardinals
- Website: School website

Chadron Senior High School is a public secondary school located in Chadron, Nebraska, United States. It is part of the Chadron Public Schools school district.
