= Hotel Chadron =

Historic building in Chadron, Nebraska, US

- U.S. National Register of Historic Places
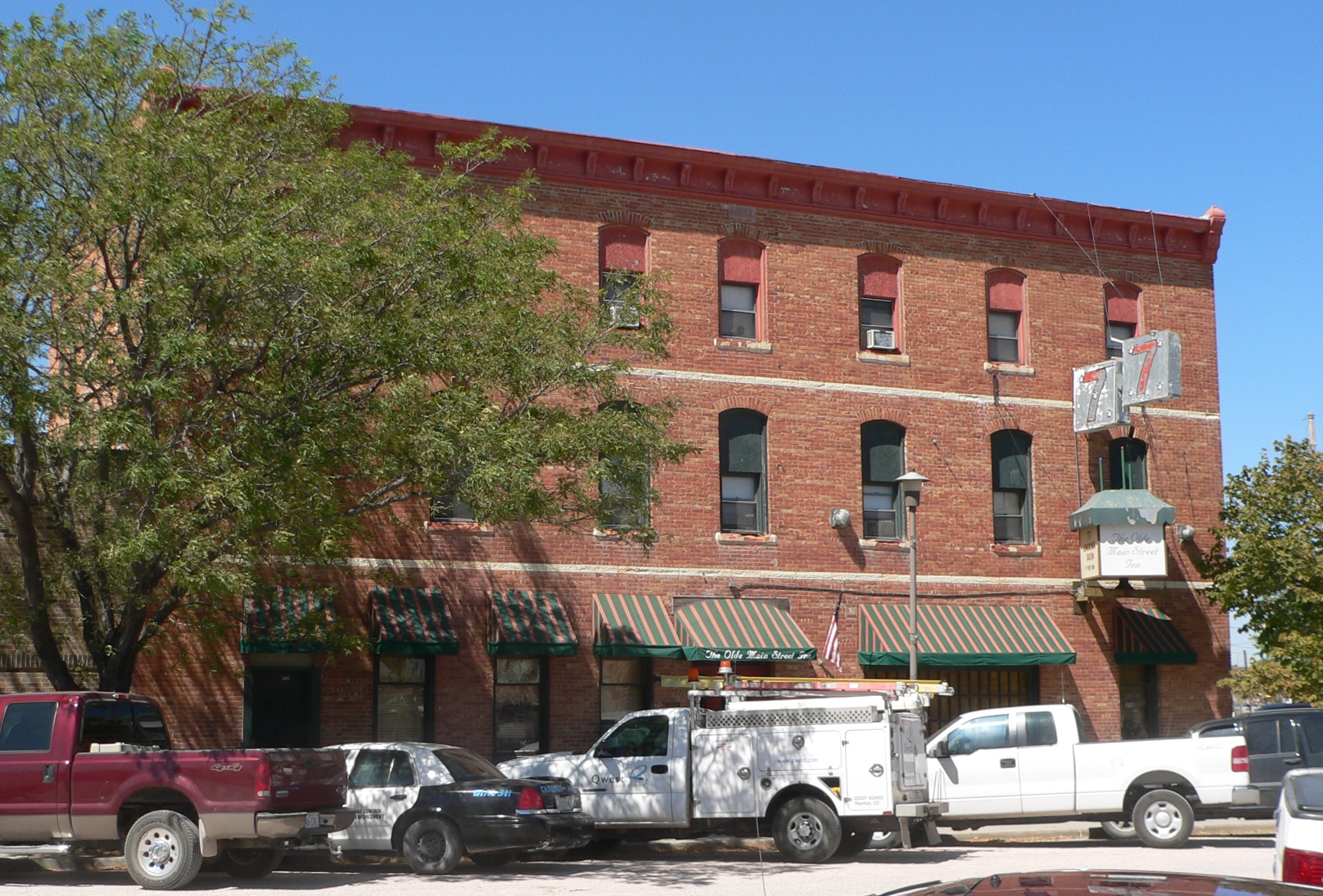

- Location within Nebraska Location within the United States
- Location: 115 Main St., Chadron, Nebraska
- Coordinates: 42°49′56″N 103°0′2″W
- Area: less than one acre
- Built: 1890
- Architectural style: Italianate
- NRHP reference No.: 02000859
- Added to NRHP: August 15, 2002

The Hotel Chadron, at 115 Main St. in Chadron, Nebraska, was built in 1890 in Italianate style. It has also been known as the Railroad YMCA and as the Olde Main Street Inn. It was listed on the National Register of Historic Places in 2002.

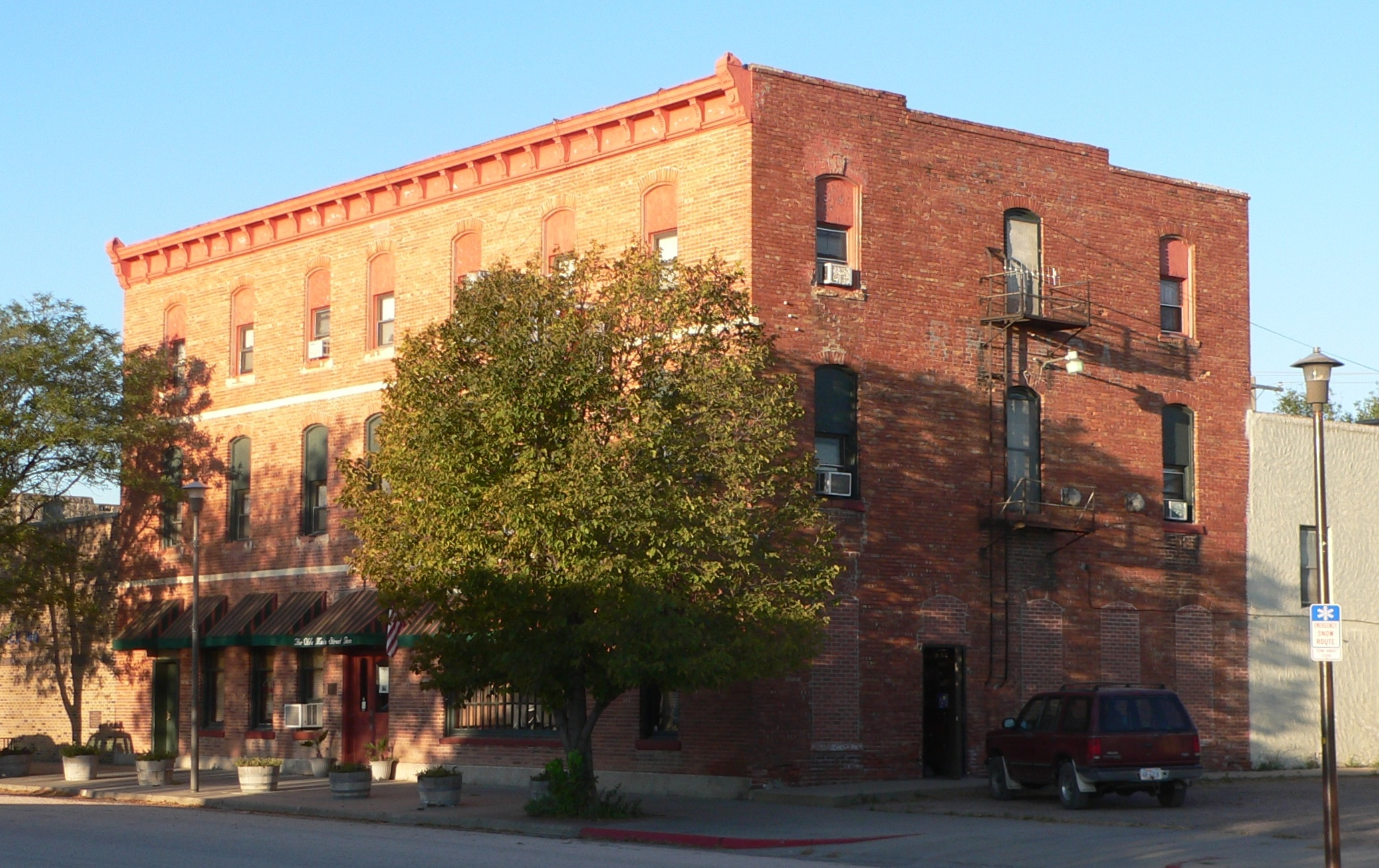

The hotel opened August 8, 1890, as a replacement for a previous hotel that burned. It served as the headquarters for investigating general Nelson A. Miles while he investigated the Wounded Knee Massacre of December 29, 1890. Miles came to the Chadron Hotel immediately, arriving December 30, and within weeks identified "blind stupidity or criminal indifference" as contributing causes of the tragedy. It is unclear how long he stayed at the hotel.
