= Chadron, Nebraska =

City in Dawes County, Nebraska, US

- City
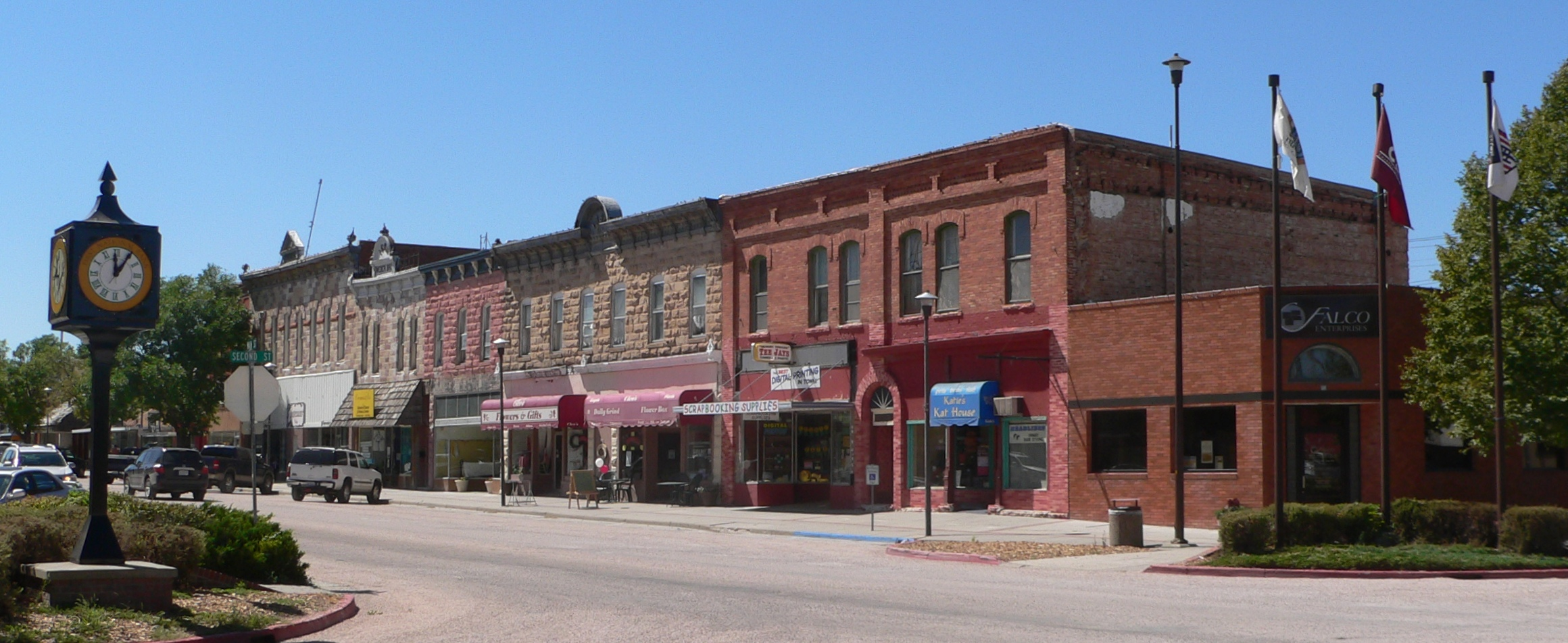
- The Chadron Commercial Historic District, which is listed in the National Register of Historic Places, August 2010

- Location of Chadron within Dawes County and Nebraska

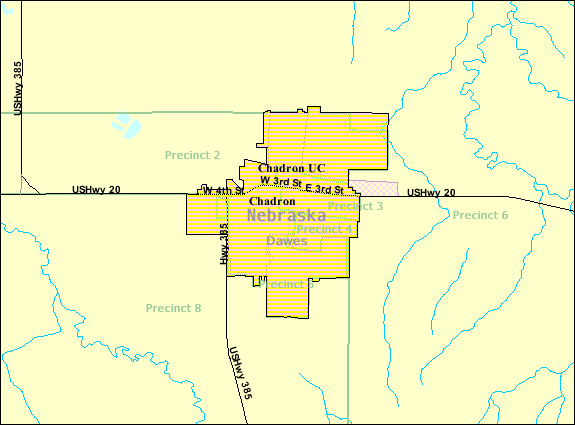
- Detailed map of Chadron
- Coordinates: 42°49′34″N 103°00′09″W
- Country: United States
- State: Nebraska
- County: Dawes

Area
  - Total: 3.90 sq mi (10.11 km^{2})
  - Land: 3.90 sq mi (10.11 km^{2})
  - Water: 0 sq mi (0.00 km^{2})
- Elevation: 3,383 ft (1,031 m)

Population (2020)
  - Total: 5,206
  - Density: 1,334.3/sq mi (515.17/km^{2})
- Time zone: UTC−7 (Mountain (MST))
  - Summer (DST): UTC−6 (MDT)
- ZIP code: 69337
- Area code: 308
- FIPS code: 31-08605
- GNIS feature ID: 2393793
- Website: chadron-nebraska.com

Chadron (/ˈʃædrən/ SHAD-rən) is a city in and the county seat of Dawes County, Nebraska, United States, in the Great Plains region. The population was 5,206 at the 2020 census.

The city is home to an 11-story high-rise on the campus of Chadron State College, with the building being the tallest in the Nebraska Panhandle.

== Description ==
Chadron also is the United States Forest Service headquarters of the Nebraska and Samuel R. McKelvie National Forests, and the Buffalo Gap, Fort Pierre, and Oglala National Grasslands. The Museum of the Fur Trade is located near Chadron, at the site of the American Fur Company's former Bordeaux Trading Post.

== History ==
Succeeding cultures of indigenous peoples lived in the area for thousands of years. In historic times, tribes such as the Oglala Lakota (Oglala Sioux Tribe), Cheyenne and others lived in the area. The Sioux used this territory as a hunting ground after pushing other tribes to the west.

Chadron is named for Louis Chartran, a French-Indian (Métis) fur trapper who ran a trading post on Chadron Creek in 1841. He was married to a Native American woman.

In 1884 the town was formally established when the Fremont, Elkhorn, and Missouri Valley Railroad was constructed through the area from Omaha, Nebraska, en route to Wyoming. Chadron was first named O'Linn for its founder Fannie O'Linn, who built a community at the confluence of the White River and Chadron Creek. This is where the railroad was expected to branch. When it was built six miles away on Bordeaux Creek, the townspeople packed up the entire town—buildings included—and moved it to the new location.

Among the founders of the town were the businessman Charles Henry King and his wife Martha. King established retail and freight businesses and banks in towns along the railroad's route; he capitalized on the flow of settlers and pioneers to the region. Four of the five King children were born in Chadron, including their second son Leslie Lynch King. In 1908 the family moved to Omaha, the business center of the state. In 1912 Leslie married, and in July 1913 became the father of the future president, Gerald Ford. King and his wife divorced soon after that.

During the 1893 Chicago World's Fair, Chadron was the starting point of the 1,000-mile "Chadron-Chicago Cowboy Horse Race." Nine riders competed for the $1,000 prize to be the first to reach the entrance of Buffalo Bill's Wild West Show. Among the riders was the former outlaw Doc Middleton. John Berry won the race in 13 days and 16 hours.

In the Lakota language, Chadron is known as čhápa wakpá otȟúŋwahe, meaning "beaver river city".

== Geography and climate ==
Chadron is located at 3,400 feet in elevation. It is surrounded by prairie grassland, broken by a ridge of lightly forested hills to the south.

According to the United States Census Bureau, the city has a total area of 3.85 square miles (9.97 km^{2}), all of it land.

The hillside letter C can be seen in the south. (42.8152°N 103.0028°W)

Chadron has a highly variable four season humid continental climate (Koppen: Dfa). Summertime is usually hot, with high daily temperature ranges. Wintertime is relatively cold, with lows usually in the teens. Precipitation is light year round but peaks in May and June.

The highest temperature recorded in Chadron is 111 °F (44 °C), recorded on August 25, 1926; the lowest is −40 °F (−40 °C), recorded on December 22, 1989.

Climate data for Chadron, Nebraska, (1991–2020 normals, extremes 1894–present)
Month	Jan	Feb	Mar	Apr	May	Jun	Jul	Aug	Sep	Oct	Nov	Dec	Year
Record high °F (°C)	70 (21)	74 (23)	92 (33)	93 (34)	98 (37)	107 (42)	110 (43)	111 (44)	106 (41)	94 (34)	82 (28)	76 (24)	111 (44)
Mean maximum °F (°C)	58.4 (14.7)	62.6 (17.0)	75.8 (24.3)	81.7 (27.6)	89.5 (31.9)	96.5 (35.8)	101.7 (38.7)	100.9 (38.3)	96.8 (36.0)	86.4 (30.2)	72.9 (22.7)	61.2 (16.2)	102.2 (39.0)
Mean daily maximum °F (°C)	38.2 (3.4)	40.9 (4.9)	51.5 (10.8)	59.4 (15.2)	69.1 (20.6)	81.1 (27.3)	89.3 (31.8)	88.4 (31.3)	79.0 (26.1)	63.6 (17.6)	50.1 (10.1)	39.3 (4.1)	62.5 (16.9)
Daily mean °F (°C)	25.3 (−3.7)	27.7 (−2.4)	37.2 (2.9)	45.1 (7.3)	55.5 (13.1)	66.4 (19.1)	74.0 (23.3)	72.3 (22.4)	62.3 (16.8)	48.2 (9.0)	35.8 (2.1)	26.2 (−3.2)	48.0 (8.9)
Mean daily minimum °F (°C)	12.5 (−10.8)	14.5 (−9.7)	23.0 (−5.0)	30.9 (−0.6)	41.9 (5.5)	51.7 (10.9)	58.6 (14.8)	56.1 (13.4)	45.7 (7.6)	32.8 (0.4)	21.5 (−5.8)	13.1 (−10.5)	33.5 (0.8)
Mean minimum °F (°C)	−10.1 (−23.4)	−8.1 (−22.3)	3.6 (−15.8)	15.4 (−9.2)	27.1 (−2.7)	39.2 (4.0)	47.4 (8.6)	44.3 (6.8)	31.4 (−0.3)	14.7 (−9.6)	1.9 (−16.7)	−6.7 (−21.5)	−18.0 (−27.8)
Record low °F (°C)	−28 (−33)	−32 (−36)	−26 (−32)	−8 (−22)	17 (−8)	31 (−1)	37 (3)	31 (−1)	15 (−9)	−13 (−25)	−16 (−27)	−40 (−40)	−44 (−42)
Average precipitation inches (mm)	0.55 (14)	0.64 (16)	1.34 (34)	2.16 (55)	2.99 (76)	3.22 (82)	1.93 (49)	1.70 (43)	1.50 (38)	1.39 (35)	0.69 (18)	0.64 (16)	18.75 (476)
Average snowfall inches (cm)	5.8 (15)	8.6 (22)	7.9 (20)	5.6 (14)	1.4 (3.6)	0.0 (0.0)	0.0 (0.0)	0.0 (0.0)	0.0 (0.0)	4.7 (12)	6.3 (16)	10.0 (25)	50.3 (128)
Average precipitation days (≥ 0.01 in)	4.1	5.5	5.6	8.7	11.0	9.0	7.2	6.7	6.0	5.7	4.3	5.1	78.9
Average snowy days (≥ 0.1 in)	4.0	5.2	3.6	2.7	0.6	0.0	0.0	0.0	0.0	1.7	3.5	5.1	26.4
Source: NOAA

== Demographics ==
Historical population
Census	Pop.	Note	%±
1890	1,867		—
1900	1,665		−10.8%
1910	2,687		61.4%
1920	4,412		64.2%
1930	4,606		4.4%
1940	4,262		−7.5%
1950	4,687		10.0%
1960	5,079		8.4%
1970	5,921		16.6%
1980	5,933		0.2%
1990	5,588		−5.8%
2000	5,634		0.8%
2010	5,851		3.9%
2020	5,206		−11.0%
U.S. Decennial Census; 2012 Estimate

=== 2020 census ===
As of the 2020 census, Chadron had a population of 5,206. The median age was 28.4 years. 19.8% of residents were under the age of 18 and 15.3% of residents were 65 years of age or older. For every 100 females there were 94.0 males, and for every 100 females age 18 and over there were 93.3 males age 18 and over.

94.6% of residents lived in urban areas, while 5.4% lived in rural areas.

There were 2,030 households in Chadron, of which 25.8% had children under the age of 18 living in them. Of all households, 38.5% were married-couple households, 22.9% were households with a male householder and no spouse or partner present, and 31.5% were households with a female householder and no spouse or partner present. About 39.1% of all households were made up of individuals and 15.1% had someone living alone who was 65 years of age or older.

There were 2,334 housing units, of which 13.0% were vacant. The homeowner vacancy rate was 2.2% and the rental vacancy rate was 7.9%.

Racial composition as of the 2020 census
Race	Number	Percent
White	4,288	82.4%
Black or African American	160	3.1%
American Indian and Alaska Native	283	5.4%
Asian	44	0.8%
Native Hawaiian and Other Pacific Islander	4	0.1%
Some other race	100	1.9%
Two or more races	327	6.3%
Hispanic or Latino (of any race)	236	4.5%

=== Income and poverty ===
The 2016–2020 5-year American Community Survey estimates show that the median household income was $48,344 (with a margin of error of +/- $3,822) and the median family income $66,281 (+/- $8,056). Males had a median income of $21,818 (+/- $7,517) versus $15,979 (+/- $2,369) for females. The median income for those above 16 years old was $18,940 (+/- $5,137). Approximately, 2.3% of families and 12.7% of the population were below the poverty line, including 2.2% of those under the age of 18 and 2.1% of those ages 65 or over.

=== 2010 census ===
As of the census of 2010, there were 5,851 people, 2,306 households, and 1,194 families living in the city. The population density was 1,519.7 inhabitants per square mile (586.8/km^{2}). There were 2,559 housing units at an average density of 664.7 per square mile (256.6/km^{2}). The racial makeup of the city was 87.8% White, 1.6% African American, 5.1% Native American, 0.8% Asian, 0.6% Pacific Islander, 1.1% from other races, and 2.9% from two or more races. Hispanic or Latino of any race were 3.6% of the population.

There were 2,306 households, of which 25.9% had children under the age of 18 living with them, 38.6% were married couples living together, 9.6% had a female householder with no husband present, 3.6% had a male householder with no wife present, and 48.2% were non-families. 38.3% of all households were made up of individuals, and 13.6% had someone living alone who was 65 years of age or older. The average household size was 2.16 and the average family size was 2.89.

The median age in the city was 26.8 years. 19.5% of residents were under the age of 18; 27.5% were between the ages of 18 and 24; 21.5% were from 25 to 44; 18.3% were from 45 to 64; and 13.1% were 65 years of age or older. The gender makeup of the city was 49.0% male and 51.0% female.

=== 2000 census ===
As of the census of 2000, there were 5,634 people, 2,187 households, and 1,150 families living in the city. The population density was 1,553.4 inhabitants per square mile (599.8/km^{2}). There were 2,441 housing units at an average density of 673.0 per square mile (259.8/km^{2}). The racial makeup of the city was 92.99% White, 0.66% African American, 3.30% Native American, 0.32% Asian, 0.09% Pacific Islander, 1.14% from other races, and 1.51% from two or more races. Hispanic or Latino of any race were 2.72% of the population.

There were 2,187 households, out of which 24.6% had children under the age of 18 living with them, 41.0% were married couples living together, 8.8% had a female householder with no husband present, and 47.4% were non-families. 34.4% of all households were made up of individuals, and 12.9% had someone living alone who was 65 years of age or older. The average household size was 2.20 and the average family size was 2.87.

In the city, the population was spread out, with 18.3% under the age of 18, 32.0% from 18 to 24, 19.9% from 25 to 44, 16.9% from 45 to 64, and 12.9% who were 65 years of age or older. The median age was 25 years. For every 100 females, there were 92.2 males. For every 100 females age 18 and over, there were 88.1 males.

As of 2000 the median income for a household in the city was $27,400, and the median income for a family was $44,420. Males had a median income of $30,353 versus $17,183 for females. The per capita income for the city was $16,312. About 11.0% of families and 21.4% of the population were below the poverty line, including 15.4% of those under age 18 and 10.3% of those age 65 or over.

== Festivals and customs ==
Every July, Chadron hosts an annual community celebration called "Fur Trade Days," in honor of its origins as a fur and hide trading post for French and other settlers in the Great Plains during the 19th century. Chadron's Museum of the Fur Trade is the largest of its kind in the United States and attracts thousands of visitors every year.

== Transportation ==
Chadron is served by Chadron Municipal Airport. Chadron City Transit offers dial-a-ride transit service within the city.

=== Roadways ===
- US 20
- US 385

== Education ==
- Chadron State College
- Chadron Senior High School
- Chadron Middle School
- Chadron Intermediate School
- Chadron Primary School

== Media ==
=== AM radio ===
- KCSR 610

=== FM radio ===
- KCNB, 94.7
- KQSK, 97.5
- KCNE, 91.9
- KBPY, 107.7

=== Newspaper ===
- The Chadron Record

== Notable people ==
- Poe Ballantine, novelist and essayist
- Don Beebe, NFL wide receiver
- Justin Bruening, actor
- Harry B. Coffee, U.S. representative from Nebraska
- James Dahlman, longtime mayor of Omaha
- Mary E. Smith Hayward, businesswoman; for 50 years, proprietor of the M. E. Smith & Co. Twin Stores in Chadron
- Charles Henry King, businessman known for founding Chadron and other cities; father of Leslie Lynch King
- Leslie Lynch King Sr., the biological father of President Gerald Ford
- Tim Walz, governor of Minnesota and Democratic vice presidential nominee
- Danny Woodhead, NFL running back

== See also ==
- List of municipalities in Nebraska
