= Chadron State College =

Public college in Chadron, Nebraska, U.S.

- Former names: Nebraska Normal School (1911–1921); Nebraska State Teachers College (1921–1964)
- Motto: Follow Your Frontier
- Type: Public college
- Established: 1911
- Parent institution: Nebraska State College System
- Accreditation: HLC
- Endowment: Chadron State Foundation
- President: Jodi Kupper
- Students: 2,098 (fall 2024)
- Undergraduates: 1,690 (fall 2024)
- Postgraduates: 408 (fall 2024)
- Location: Chadron, Nebraska, U.S. 42°49′12″N 102°59′53″W
- Campus: Rural, 281 acres (114 ha)
- Colors: Cardinal, black, Crites gray, and white
- Nickname: Eagles
- Sporting affiliations: NCAA Division II – Rocky Mountain
- Website: csc.edu

Chadron State College (CSC) is a public college in Chadron, Nebraska, United States. It is one of three public colleges in the Nebraska State College System. The school opened in June 1911 as the Chadron State Normal College. It would later re-brand to its current name in 1964. Chadron State College has an enrollment of about 2,200 students.

== History ==
Chadron State College was announced in January 1909 as the fourth normal school in the state. Bidders for the college included the towns of Ainsworth, Alliance, Chadron, Crawford, Gordon, and Rushville. The Chadron Commercial Club was one of the main entities pushing for the school to be located in Chadron. While the school was originally meant to open Fall 1910, opposition from then-governor Ashton C. Shallenberger and the Alliance Commercial Club delayed its opening. The college opened in 1911 as the Chadron State Normal College.

In March 1921, the Nebraska State Legislature passed a bill making all state-funded normal schools colleges. This also gave the schools the legal right to grant a Bachelor of Arts degree. Following this, the college changed its name to the Chadron State Teachers College. In 1964, the college re-branded to its current name, Chadron State College. In September 1967, the college opened the High Rise Dormitory, an eleven-story high-rise dorm complex. It opened as the tallest building in Western Nebraska.

In 1999 the Nebraska Unicameral Legislature introduced bill LB631, aimed at merging Chadron State College and Wayne State College into the University of Nebraska system, while turning Peru State College into a community college. A competing bill, LB650, was introduced about the same time but with the intent of funding Peru State College $7 million for renovations. However, these plans would be abandoned soon after.

In July 2006, the college was in danger of damage from the Spotted Tail wildfire. Spotted Tail was caused by a lightning strike on July 26 about seven miles (11 km) south of Chadron. By July 28, the wildfire reached the edge of Chadron and the college campus. Fire crews prevented the wildfire from reaching the campus. The Pine Ridge escarpment south of the college, including C-Hill, was deforested as a result of the fire.

=== Presidents ===
No.	Name	Tenure	Ref.
1	Joseph Sparks	1911–1916	
2	Robert I. Elliott	1916–1940	
acting	E.L. Rouse	1939–1941	
3	Wiley G. Brooks	1941–1954	
4	Barton L. Kline	1954–1961	
5	F. Clark Elkins	1961–1967	
6	Edwin C. Nelson	1967–1973	
7	Larry G. Tangeman	1973–1975	
executive secretary	Edwin C. Nelson	1975–1986	
8	Samuel H. Rankin	1986–1998	
9	Thomas L. Krepel	1998–2005	
10	Janie Park	2005–2012	
11	Richard R. Rhine	2012–2023	
12	Ron K. Patterson	2023–2025	
13	Jodi Kupper	2025–present	

== Campus ==
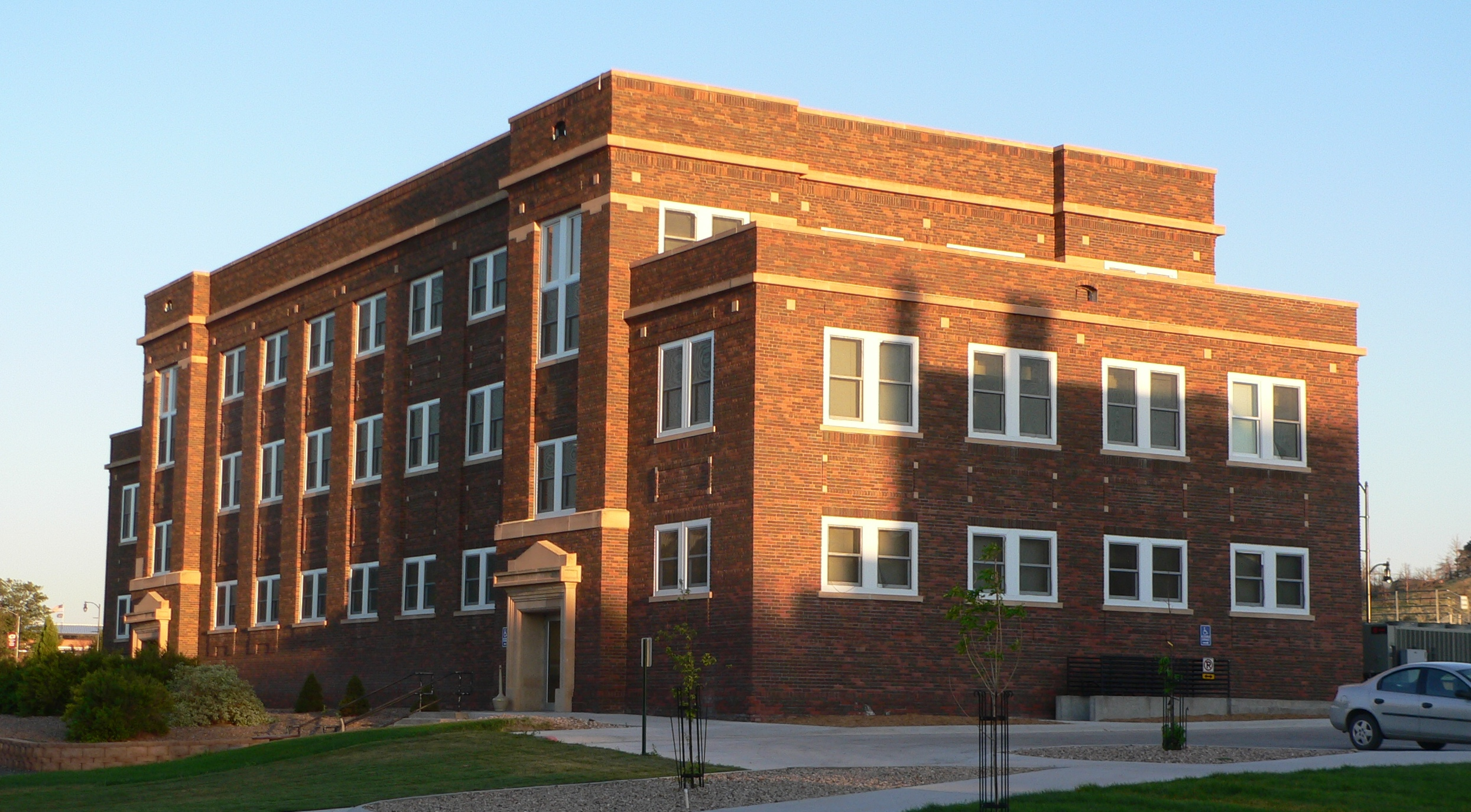
Adelaide Miller Hall

Chadron State College's campus is located in Chadron, Nebraska, United States. The campus is 281-acre (114 ha) and has 25 major buildings. The campus includes eight academic buildings, six athletic buildings, three administration buildings, and five residential buildings. The campus includes High Rise, an eleven-story high-rise building which is the tallest building in Western Nebraska. Five of the buildings are listed on the National Register of Historic Places. NRHP-listed buildings include the Sparks, Miller, Edna Work, and Crites Halls, and the Media Center, which were all listed in 1983.

== Academics ==
Undergraduate demographics as of Fall 2023
Race and ethnicity	Total
White	76%
Hispanic	12%
Black	4%
Two or more races	4%
American Indian/Alaska Native	2%
International student	1%
Unknown	1%
Economic diversity
Low-income (Note: The percentage of students who received an income-based federal Pell grant intended for low-income students.)	37%
Affluent (Note: The percentage of students who are a part of the American middle class at the bare minimum.)	63%

Chadron State College is a state-funded college. As of 2025, 1,600 students are enrolled. The college includes 23 undergraduate fields of study. Major fields of study include Business Administration, Teachers Degree and Professional Development, Multi/Interdisciplinary Studies, Plant Sciences, and Criminal Justice and Corrections. It is accredited by the Higher Learning Commission with some programs and academic units also accredited by discipline-specific organizations.

It offers more than 49 majors leading to bachelor's degrees and 8 professional studies options. Pre-professional programs in the health sciences are available, including the Rural Health Opportunities Program (RHOP) conducted jointly with the University of Nebraska Medical Center. Chadron State College also includes a partnership with Western Nebraska Community College in Scottsbluff through the Panhandle Advantage Program.

== Athletics ==
Chadron State College, whose athletic teams are known as the Eagles, competes in the National Collegiate Athletic Association Division II. Chadron State sponsors 12 varsity athletic teams: men's and women's basketball; men's and women's cross country; football; women's golf; softball; men's and women's track and field; women's volleyball; and men's and women's wrestling.

== Notable alumni ==
- Jim Anderson – politician
- Don Beebe – professional football player and coach
- Val Logsdon Fitch – nuclear physicist (attended for three years before being drafted into U.S. Army in 1943)
- John Freudenberg – judge
- Garrett Gilkey – professional football player
- Jennifer L. Green – statistics professor
- Rafael Bastos Hocsman – comedian
- Jerry D. Mahlman – meteorologist
- Terrance McKinney – professional mixed martial artist
- Joel Rickenbach – politician
- Steve McClain – college basketball coach
- Lolo Letalu Matalasi Moliga – politician
- Larry Riley – professional basketball coach
- Togiola Tulafono – politician
- Tim Walz – politician, ran for Vice President of the United States in 2024
- Danny Woodhead – professional football player
