= Million dollar bill =

A million dollar bill often refers to fantasy United States currency produced as a joke.

Million dollar bill may also refer to:

- Million Dollar Bill (album), the debut album of Australian musician Billy Thorpe
- "Million Dollar Bill", Whitney Houston song
- "Million Dollar Bills", by Lorde, from The Love Club EP, 2012
- "Million Dollar Bills", by Jukebox the Ghost, from Cheers, 2022
- "Million Dollar Bill", nickname for NASCAR driver Bill Elliott

== See also ==
- One Million Dollars
- Millionaire (disambiguation)
- One million (disambiguation)
- Dollar (disambiguation)
