= List of Superfund sites in Washington (state) =

A map of superfund sites in Washington.

This is a list of Superfund sites in Washington State designated under the Comprehensive Environmental Response, Compensation, and Liability Act (CERCLA) environmental law in the US state. The CERCLA federal law of 1980 authorized the United States Environmental Protection Agency (EPA) to create a list of polluted locations requiring a long-term response to clean up hazardous material contaminations.

These locations are known as Superfund sites, and are placed on the National Priorities List (NPL). The NPL guides the EPA in "determining which sites warrant further investigation" for environmental remediation. As of May 1, 2010, there were 48 Superfund sites on the National Priorities List in Washington. Seventeen others have been cleaned up and removed from the list; no sites are currently proposed for addition.

== Superfund sites ==
Deleted from National Priorities List

CERCLIS ID	Name	County	Reason	Proposed	Listed	Construction completed	Partially deleted	Deleted
WAD009045279	Alcoa (Vancouver Smelter)	Clark	Soil and groundwater contaminated by fluoride and cyanide and soil also contaminated by alumina.	June 24, 1988	February 21, 1990	July 30, 1996	–	September 30, 1996
WAD057311094	American Crossarm & Conduit Co.	Lewis	Ground water, soil, and sediments were contaminated with PCP and creosote. The soil also contained dioxins.	June 24, 1988	April 10, 1989	September 26, 1996	–	–
WAD980833065	American Lake Gardens/McChord Air Force Base	Pierce	Shallow groundwater is contaminated with VOCs, including TCE and DCE.	August 9, 1983	September 21, 1984	September 29, 1994	–	–
WA5170027291	Bangor Naval Submarine Base (US Navy)	Kitsap	Groundwater, soils, surface water, and sediments contain TNT and RDX.	July 14, 1989	August 30, 1990	September 25, 2001	–	–
WA7170027265	Bangor Ordnance Disposal (US Navy)	Kitsap	Groundwater, soil, leachate and surface water contaminated by TNT and RDX; soil contaminated by lead.	October 15, 1984	July 22, 1987	September 23, 1999	–	–
WA1891406349	Bonneville Power Administration Ross Complex (USDOE)	Clark	Soil was contaminated by PCBs, PAHs, PCP, lead and other heavy metals. Groundwater contains elevated levels of DCE and chloroform.	July 14, 1989	November 21, 1989	April 4, 1996	–	September 23, 1996
WAD009624453	Boomsnub/Airco	Clark	Groundwater contaminated by chromium and VOCs, including TCE, PCE and freon-11. Soil on Boomsnub site contaminated by hexavalant chromium.	January 18, 1994	April 25, 1995	–	–	–
WAD980836662	Centralia Municipal Landfill	Lewis	Groundwater contains elevated levels of chloride and heavy metals including manganese, arsenic and iron. Leachate has drained into nearby rivers.	June 24, 1988	August 30, 1990	September 28, 1999	–	–
WAD980514541	Colbert Landfill	Spokane	Soil and groundwater contamination from VOCs dumped on site, including methylene dichloride and TCA.	December 30, 1982	August 9, 1983	September 9, 1997	–	–
WAD980726368	Commencement Bay, Near Shore/Tide Flats	Pierce	At the Asarco smelter, metals including arsenic, cadmium, copper and lead were released into the soil, air and bay and metals from slag have migrated to surface and groundwater. Soil in the Ruston/North Tacoma study area is contaminated by arsenic and lead. Soil, surface water and groundwater across most of the Tacoma Tar Pits site is contaminated by metals, PAHs, PCBs, and VOCs including benzene, from a former coal gasification plant and recycling operations. Ship building, oil refining, chemical manufacture and storage and other industrial activity has contaminated the land and sediments of the bay with hazardous waste.	December 30, 1982	August 9, 1983	–	October 29, 1996	–
WAD980726301	Commencement Bay, South Tacoma Channel	Pierce	In the Tacoma Landfill site, soil and groundwater are contaminated by VOCs and heavy metals; groundwater is also contaminated by PAHs. Groundwater at Well 12A is contaminated by VOCs and soil by VOCs and lead. Industrial activities at South Tacoma Field led to soil contamination by lead, arsenic, copper and PCBs and groundwater contamination by VOCs and petroleum hydrocarbons.	December 30, 1982	August 9, 1983	September 29, 1999	June 14, 2005	–
WA9571924647	Fairchild Air Force Base (4 Waste Areas)	Spokane	Groundwater, soil and sediments are contaminated by VOCs (primarily TCE), semi-volatile organic compounds and inorganic compounds.	June 24, 1988	March 13, 1989	–	–	–
WAD000643577	FMC Corp. (Yakima Pit)	Yakima	Groundwater and soil contamination by pesticides including DDT and derivatives, which were formerly dumped in a "poison pit" on site.	December 30, 1982	August 9, 1983	January 9, 1993	–	–
WA9214053465	Fort Lewis (Landfill No. 5)	Pierce	Groundwater was contaminated by heavy metals and organic compounds.	October 15, 1984	July 22, 1987	February 28, 1995	–	May 22, 1995
WA7210090067	Fort Lewis Logistics Center (US Army)	Pierce	Soil and shallow groundwater contamination by VOCs including TCE, DCE and PAHs.	July 14, 1989	November 21, 1989	–	–	–
WAD053614988	Frontier Hard Chrome, Inc.	Clark	Groundwater and soil contaminated by trivalent chromium and high concentrations of hexavalent chromium.	December 20, 1982	August 9, 1983	September 22, 2003	–	–
WAD001865450	General Electric Co. (Spokane Shop)	Spokane	On-site soil, groundwater and sludge contaminated by PCBs from electrical transformer repair and storage.	June 24, 1988	April 10, 1989	March 18, 1999	–	–
WAD980514608	Greenacres Landfill	Spokane	Groundwater contains VOCs, semi-volatile organic compounds and heavy metals. The site is close to the sole-source aquifer for 400,000 people.	August 9, 1983	September 21, 1984	July 23, 1999	–	–
WASFN1002174	Hamilton/Labree Roads GW Contamination	Lewis	Shallow drinking water aquifer contaminated by PCE and its decomposition products, and by tetrahydrofuran and methylene chloride. There are also very low levels of PCE contamination in soil and sediments.	November 5, 2000	July 27, 2000	–	–	–
WA5210890096	Hamilton Island Landfill (USA/COE)	Skamania	Investigation showed that hazardous substances present did not pose a risk to human health or the environment.	July 29, 1991	October 14, 1992	March 30, 1995	–	May 25, 1995
WA3890090076	Hanford 100-Area (USDOE)	Benton	Soils contaminated by radiological and chemical waste from plutonium manufacture for the Manhattan Project and subsequent activities. Groundwater contaminated by strontium-90, carbon-14, tritium and hexavalent chromium and discharges into the Columbia River, which is the water supply for over 170,000 people.	June 24, 1988	April 10, 1989	–	August 7, 1998	–
WA1890090078	Hanford 200-Area (USDOE)	Benton	Groundwater and soil contamination by tritium, uranium, cyanide, carbon tetrachloride, technetium and other substances from processing, finishing and managing nuclear materials including plutonium for nuclear weapons.	June 24, 1988	April 10, 1989	–	–	–
WA2890090077	Hanford 300-Area (USDOE)	Benton	Groundwater contamination by uranium, VOCs, strontium-90 and tritium from nuclear fuel fabrication. Soil contamination by uranium, cobalt-60, copper, PCBs, chromium and possibly other substances. Uranium and TCE have been detected in groundwater adjacent to the Columbia River, which is used for drinking water for over 170,000 people.	June 24, 1988	April 10, 1989	–	–	–
WA4890090075	Hanford 1100-Area (USDOE)	Benton	Wells contaminated by VOCs including TCE and soil by asbestos, heavy metals and PCBs from maintenance activities.	June 24, 1988	April 10, 1989	July 25, 1996	–	September 30, 1996
WAD980722839	Harbor Island (Lead)	King	Groundwater contains benzene, ethylbenzene, xylene, mercury, cadmium, lead and zinc but is not a source of drinking water. Soil is contaminated primarily by heavy metals, PCBs and petroleum and sediments near the island by heavy metals, PAHs, tributyl tin and PCBs.	December 30, 1982	August 9, 1983	–	July 11, 1996	–
WAD980511539	Hidden Valley Landfill (Thun Field)	Pierce	Groundwater and leachate contaminated by metals, VOCs and nitrates.	October 6, 1986	March 31, 1989	September 28, 2000	–	–
WA3170090044	Jackson Park Housing Complex (US Navy)	Kitsap	Soil contamination by arsenic, cadmium, chromium, copper, lead, nickel, zinc, TNT, DNT, trinitrobenzene and dinitrobenzene from former ordnance operations. Offshore sediments contain abandoned ordnance.	June 23, 1993	May 31, 1994	–	–	–
WAD000065508	Kaiser Aluminum Mead Works	Spokane	Cyanide and fluoride contamination of groundwater and leachate.	December 30, 1982	August 9, 1983	–	–	–
WAD050075662	Lakewood-Ponders Corner Superfund Site	Pierce	Groundwater and soil contamination by TCE and PCE from dry cleaning operations.	December 30, 1982	August 9, 1983	September 29, 1992	November 27, 1996	–
WAN001002655	Lockheed West Seattle	King	Past industrial practices have contaminated sediment with heavy metals including arsenic, chromium, copper, lead, silver and zinc, with butyl tins and with PCBs and PAHs.	September 29, 2006	July 3, 2007	–	–	–
WA0002329803	Lower Duwamish Waterway	King	Sediment contamination by mercury, arsenic, other heavy metals, PCBs, PAHs, dioxins, furans, and phthalates.	January 12, 2000	September 13, 2001	–	–	–
WA8570024200	McChord Air Force Base (Wash Rack/Treat)	Pierce	A layer of benzene-contaminated fuel emulsion is sitting on top of the water table. Benzene levels in the groundwater have now fallen below EPA safe drinking water levels.	October 15, 1984	July 22, 1987	March 29, 1995	–	September 26, 1996
WAD980511661	Mica Landfill	Spokane	Groundwater contains VOCs, heavy metals and phenols from licensed hazardous waste disposal. Leachate contamination by inorganic ions, metals and at least twenty regulated organic compounds. Methane is accumulating at potentially explosive levels.	October 15, 1984	October 6, 1986	December 2, 2002	–	–
WAD980978753	Midnite Mine	Stevens	Surface water, groundwater, soil and sediments contamination by metals and radionuclides from former uranium ore mining. Mine drainage is acidic.	June 22, 1999	November 5, 2000	–	–	–
WAD980638910	Midway Landfill	King	Groundwater contamination by heavy metals and VOCs; landfill gas emissions contaminated by VOCs. Risks associated with heavy metals are now under control; groundwater VOCs are greatly reduced; gas VOCs have been addressed.	May 10, 1984	October 6, 1986	September 21, 2000	–	–
WAD988466355	Moses Lake Wellfield Contamination	Grant	Groundwater TCE contamination, including municipal and private wells. Wells within Federal drinking water standards have now been constructed.	July 29, 1991	October 14, 1992	–	–	–
WA5170090059	Naval Air Station, Whidbey Island (Ault)	Island	Ault Field groundwater is contaminated by VOCs including TCE and TCA. Soils and sediments are contaminated by PCBs, heavy metals, pesticides, PAHs and dioxins.	September 18, 1985	February 21, 1990	September 25, 1997	–	–
WA6170090058	Naval Air Station, Whidbey Island (Seaplane)	Island	Soil in areas of the seaplane base was contaminated by heavy metals including lead and arsenic, pesticides and PAHs. Contaminated soil has been removed; possible remaining groundwater, surface water and sediment contamination is not thought to pose a risk to human health or the environment.	September 18, 1985	February 21, 1990	June 29, 1995	–	September 21, 1995
WA1170023419	Naval Undersea Warfare Station (4 Areas)	Kitsap	Soil, sediments and groundwater contamination by PCBs, petroleum hydrocarbons, heavy metals and VOCs from base operations. Chemical contamination of local shellfish is no longer at levels that cause health concern but the area is closed to shellfishing because of sewage contamination from other sources.	October 6, 1986	April 10, 1989	June 27, 2000	–	–
WAD000641548	North Market Street	Spokane	Groundwater and soil contamination by petroleum compounds, PAHs and VOCs from former petroleum refiny.	June 24, 1988	March 30, 1990	December 30, 2002	–	–
WAD980511778	Northside Landfill	Spokane	Groundwater and domestic well contamination by organic solvents including PCE from former landfill practices. On-site sludge contains TCE and PCE. The aquifer below the site contains VOCs and is the sole drinking water source for the city of Spokane	October 15, 1984	October 6, 1986	February 9, 1993	–	–
WAD980833974	Northwest Transformer	Whatcom	Soil contaminated by PCBs has now been removed.	October 15, 1984	October 6, 1986	March 31, 1994	–	September 28, 1999
WAD027315621	Northwest Transformer (South Harkness St)	Whatcom	Soil and buildings were contaminated by PCBs and heavy metals including arsenic, cadmium and lead.	June 24, 1988	February 21, 1990	September 29, 1994	–	September 26, 1997
WAD980982557	Old Inland Pit	Spokane	Soil contains elevated levels of heavy metals from dumping of foundry waste in a former gravel pit. Groundwater contamination is at low levels and monitoring continues.	October 6, 1986	February 21, 1990	January 2, 1999	–	August 31, 1999
WAD008957243	Oeser Co	Whatcom	Soil and groundwater contamination by creosote, PCP, carrier oil and dioxins from former and ongoing wood treatment operations.	December 23, 1996	September 25, 1997	–	–	–
WA8680030931	Old Navy Dump/Manchester Lab (USEPA/NOAA)	Kitsap	Former US Navy site. Firefighting training contaminated soil with dioxins and petroleum hydrocarbons. Hydraulic erosion of a landfill area contaminated sediments and shellfish in Clam Bay with PCBs, copper, lead and zinc. Seeps from the landfill contained elevated levels of copper, nickel, zinc and PCBs.	January 18, 1994	May 31, 1994	September 30, 2002	–	–
WAD009249210	Pacific Car & Foundry Co.	King	Soil was contaminated by heavy metals, PAHs and PCBs from former manufacturing facility. Groundwater contamination by heavy metals, petroleum products and solvents. Around 37,000 people obtain drinking water from wells within three miles of the site.	June 24, 1988	February 21, 1990	May 8, 1996	–	–
WAD009248287	Pacific Sound Resources	King	Soil and groundwater contamination by PCP, PAHs and heavy metals from former wood treatment operations. Marine sediment contamination, primarily by PAHs, has contaminated seafood.	October 5, 1993	May 31, 1994	September 16, 2005	–	–
WA0000026534	Palermo Well Field Ground Water Contamination	Thurston	Groundwater and surface water contaminated by PCE from a dry cleaning business and TCE from former and current Washington DOT facilities. Three contaminated municipal drinking water wells have been closed.	December 23, 1996	January 4, 1997	February 22, 2001	–	–
WAD991281874	Pasco Sanitary Landfill	Franklin	Groundwater contamination by VOCs, including TCE, toluene and xylene from former landfill practices.	June 24, 1988	February 21, 1990	–	–	–
WAD120513957	Pesticide Lab (Yakima)	Yakima	A waste pipe and on-site septic tank that carried a risk of contaminating groundwater have been removed.	December 30, 1982	August 9, 1983	September 30, 1992	–	January 9, 1993
WA4170090001	Port Hadlock Detachment (US Navy)	Jefferson	Shellfish next to a former landfill contain elevated levels of heavy metals and pesticides. Another possibly contaminated area was found not to pose a risk.	June 23, 1993	May 31, 1994	September 29, 1997	–	June 14, 2005
WA2170023418	Puget Sound Naval Shipyard Complex	Kitsap	Soil, sediment and groundwater contamination by petroleum hydrocarbons, heavy metals, VOCs and PCBs. Groundwater flows into the Sinclair Inlet where it is a hazard to tribal fishermen, marine life and recreational users.	October 5, 1993	May 31, 1994	August 22, 2007	–	–
WAD980511745	Queen City Farms	King	Former landfill site. Groundwater, surface water and sludge contamination by VOCs (including TCE and DCE); residential wells contaminated by arsenic. Soil contamination by PCBs and metals. Groundwater contamination is currently contained on-site.	August 9, 1983	September 21, 1984	September 9, 1997	–	–
WAD980639215	Quendall Terminals	King	Soil and groundwater contamination by PAHs, benzene and creosote products from former creosote manufacturing plant. Contaminant release to Lake Washington is a concern and could affect wildlife, including chinook salmon, a federal threatened species.	September 14, 2005	April 19, 2006	–	–	–
WAD980639462	Seattle Municipal Landfill (Kent Highlands)	King	Landfill gas contains VOCs including toluene, xylene, vinyl chloride, and TCE. Groundwater is contaminated with VOCs and heavy metals.	June 24, 1988	August 30, 1990	July 9, 1995	–	–
WAD980722789	Silver Mountain Mine	Okanogan	Soil and surface water contamination by arsenic and cyanide from former silver and gold mining. Cyanide has been neutralized, contaminated water removed and tailings consolidated and capped.	October 15, 1984	October 6, 1986	September 28, 1992	–	September 22, 1997
WAD981767296	Spokane Junkyard/Associated Properties	Spokane	The junkyard contained asbestos, oil contaminated with PCBs, flammable materials and VOCs. Soil was contaminated with lead and PCBs.	October 14, 1992	May 31, 1994	July 14, 1997	–	September 23, 1997
WAD980723506	Toftdahl Drums	Clark	Surface water, groundwater and soil were contaminated by heavy metals and PCBs from used drum cleaning facility.	October 15, 1984	October 6, 1986	September 30, 1986	–	December 23, 1988
WAD980639256	Tulalip Landfill	Snohomish	Groundwater, wetlands and sloughs were contaminated with heavy metals including lead, copper, chromium and cadmium from former dumping of commercial, industrial and hospital waste. On-site leachate and surface water was contaminated by heavy metals, PCBs, and VOCs including toluene and xylene. Leachate, surface water and slough water was contaminated by multiply resistant pathogens.	July 29, 1991	April 25, 1995	September 28, 2000	–	September 18, 2002
WAD988519708	Vancouver Water Station#1 Contamination	Clark	Groundwater contamination by PCE from an unknown source. Wells supply up to 20 million gallons of drinking water per day to Vancouver, Washington and Clark County, which is treated to remove PCE before supply.	June 23, 1993	May 31, 1994	September 25, 1998	–	–
WAD988475158	Vancouver Water Station#4 Contamination	Clark	Groundwater contamination by PCE, suspected to come from dry cleaning operations. Treatment facilities remove PCE from drinking water before supply.	July 29, 1991	October 14, 1992	August 9, 1999	–	–
WAD009487513	Western Processing Company, Inc.	King	Former industrial waste processing facility. Groundwater and sediment contamination by VOCs, phenols and heavy metals. Soil was contaminated by VOCs, PCBs, phenols and metals. VOCs and metals detected in surface water.	December 30, 1982	August 9, 1983	December 23, 1991	–	–
WAD009248295	Wyckoff Company/Eagle Harbor	Kitsap	Former wood treatment facility and shipyard. Soil, groundwater and seeps onto beaches contain elevated levels of PAHs, PCBs, dioxins and furans. Marine sediments contain PAHs, mercury (element), other metals and PCBs. There are also pools of liquid contaminants on the harbor bottom.	September 18, 1985	July 22, 1987	–	–	–
WAD040187890	Yakima Plating Co.	Yakima	Groundwater contained low levels of heavy metals including copper, lead and zinc.	June 24, 1988	March 31, 1989	September 30, 1992	–	August 23, 1994
Site ID 77319379	Grain Handling Facility at Freeman	Spokane	The grain handling facility at Freeman has leached carbon tetrachloride into soil and groundwater.					

== See also ==
- List of Superfund sites in the United States
- List of environmental issues
- List of waste types
- TOXMAP
