= Navajo Uranium Assessment and Kidney Health Project =

The Navajo Uranium Assessment and Kidney Health Project (NUAKHP) was a congressionally mandated study conducted by researchers from the University of New Mexico and Crownpoint IHS Hospital on kidney functions of Navajo Native Americans who lived and worked near decommissioned uranium mines. The long-term goal of the five-year project beginning in 2006, was to use the studies results to develop a kidney health registry to inform concerned people about possible risks of local drinking water.
