= Felt theory =

Felt theory is an academic theory that builds upon conceptualizations of trauma and the processing of emotions, taking form in various disciplines and sectors of humanity. Frequently and most widely seen in Native/Indigenous cultures, the concept was first discussed by Tanana Athabascan scholar Dian Million in 2009. Felt theory aims to utilize experiences to properly and most informedly recover from traumatic events, highlighting storytelling and nostalgia as paramount features.

Felt theory's roots in Indigenous cultures make it an integral piece in the quest for decolonization of not only countries and nations, but of thought, liberatory practices, and speech. Grounded in feminist praxis and an analysis of personal and cultural experiences, felt theory catalyzes empowerment based in the acknowledgment of pain.

== Origins ==
Felt theory was first discussed by Dian Million in the article "Felt Theory: An Indigenous Feminist Approach to Affect and History". In the article, Million posits:

I suggest ways that Indigenous women participated in creating new language for communities to address the real multilayered facets of their histories and concerns by insisting on the inclusion of our lived experience, rich with emotional knowledges, of what pain and grief and hope meant or mean now in our pasts and futures. It is also to underline again the importance of felt experiences as community knowledges that interactively inform our positions as Native scholars, particularly as Native women scholars. Our felt scholarship continues to be segregated as a “feminine” experience, as polemic, or at worst as not knowledge at all.

Seeking to transform liberatory practices into a more introspective, emotion-driven experience, Million described a space in which marginalized voices were not only heard, but welcomed. Her scholarship focuses heavily on the experiences of First Nations women and other Indigenous communities—including her own—examines injustices within the Canadian government and within things like the Canadian Indian Act, setting a new standard for what Indigenous feminism and the theory within it could look like.

== Cultural significance in the United States ==
Felt theory extends far beyond the traditional scope of conversations within feminist theory, relevant in many disciplines and subcategories, and able to be implemented by individuals of all cultures, backgrounds, and histories.

Among others, Native feminist and scholar Angie Morrill of the Klamath Tribes of Oregon uses Million's words to analyze a painting by Peggy Jo Ball—a Klamath artist, also Morrill's mother—and focuses on the effects that gentrification and dislocation has on Indigenous/Native people, but also those of lower socioeconomic status or other marginalized groups.

Analyzing Ball's work in a 2016 article, "Time Traveling Dogs (and Other Native Feminist Ways to Defy Dislocations)", Morrill speaks to the idea of survivance, a word used by some Indigenous people to describe a creative or narrative approach to processing trauma, and the deep emotional experience of the everyday lives of Native women—something Morrill sees as “incomprehensible” in hegemonic spaces.

Later, she presents “rememory” as a powerful healing practice for survivors of abuse and trauma, a process that she says involves reforming memories that have been previously erased—like those of trauma. Angie Morrill's writing supports a stronger understanding of the power of memories and the explicit ramifications of dislocations from society or from the freedom to speak—thus informing nuanced conceptions of gendered colonization and its lasting effects on modern survivors.

== Transnational usage of felt theory ==
Many Indigenous women find their felt power in forms of liberation rooted in their own bodies, with much of their healing practice focusing on female resilience and strength, rather than wholly analyzing traditional power structures built around hierarchy or gender-based discrimination—these concepts are present nonetheless.

Cultural anthropology scholar Catherine Whittaker of Goethe University Frankfurt centers her research in a 2020 article around women—Whittaker speaks about Nahuatl women, among others—living in Mexico City, constituting felt power (the implementation of felt theory) as something grounded in the reality of the pain and abuse experienced, its true meaning and impact unique for each individual.

In a section in which she talks about the individual experiences of women she spoke to during her research, Whittaker writes on one woman, a victim of domestic abuse and violence:

Leona emphasized that she was not a passive, powerless victim of her husband's violence or her father's ideology, both of which she criticized and had resisted [...] By drawing on received knowledge, her faith, and her observations, Leona not only managed to slowly improve her situation but also earned respect from her neighbors and the reputation of being strong. She described her hard, physical work both as a sacrifice and as play, having found joy and satisfaction in her tangible achievements and trained, embodied, and spiritual ability to endure. “As a mother, I had to raise my children, and as a wife, I had to work with [my husband]. And working, we forgot the fight."

According to Sara Salem, a professor at the London School of Economics, felt power provides survivors with something that is simultaneously unique and collective, making space for compassion and collaboration, allowing feeling can to live harmoniously with lived experiences and fostering an environment of resilience. Extending Million's theory to a transnational level, acconding to Salem, resulted in a deeper understanding of felt theory's applications and positive impacts, establishing it as a useful and successful theory.

== Felt theory to decolonize ==
One of felt theory's greatest impacts is found within the process of decolonizing theory, life, and speech. Whether they be physical or metaphysical, forms of enslavement or control have lasting implications and can extend their power into sectors of humanity that require autonomy to liberate—thus inhibiting any sort of recovery.

More recently, in light of sexual misconduct allegations against Native American writer Sherman Alexie (The Absolutely True Diary of a Part-Time Indian), communication scholar Cortney Smith of Oberlin College examined the implications of Indigenous feminism on the #MeToo movement, in part revealing how important Native narratives are in shaping the 21st-century decolonization of the U.S. Smith references the concept of authenticity as being a harmful tool used against Indigenous women in sexual assault cases. Smith explains:

some Native women fear being labelled "untraditional" or "assimilated" if they knowingly embrace feminism (St. Denis 2007). A viable threat within Native communities is to deem someone as "untraditional" or "inauthentic": in other words, not being "Native enough." Native women who label themselves as feminists run the risk of such a label for allegedly putting the goals of gender rights before the goals of the community and Native sovereignty (Nickel 2017). The questioning of one's Indigenous authenticity can have vital consequences for one's reputation and relationships within the community. In the context of sexual harassment, Indigenous authenticity can be a way of discrediting or harming an accuser.

By challenging current frameworks of growth-inhibiting, hegemonic praxis within the #MeToo movement that often leaves out the marginalized women and individuals that helped create it, Smith stresses the value of felt knowledge and personal experiences in the liberation of today's community, especially those enduring the consequences of generational trauma. The concept of Indigenous “authenticity” has an insurmountable impact on felt thought and trauma processing, especially in the presence of clear power dynamics.

Away from the United States, philosophy scholar Anna Cook of the University of Oregon explored the complex relationship between experience, truth, and a phenomenon referred to as “settler denial” in the context of Canadian colonialism and Indigenous trauma. Addressing the Canadian government's recent acknowledgement of the trauma of colonization upon Native individuals, felt theory examines the impacts of internalized notions of colonialism, particularly evident in spaces where abuse stories are shared within organizations like the Truth and Reconciliation Commission (TRC). These stories have been “unheard” or not accepted due to rigid structures of power and control, especially due to Canada's delayed acknowledgement of it, or as Cook characterizes, “historical amnesia”.

With this in mind, she breaks down concepts of what should be regarded as politically meaningful and shows how corrosive settler denial can be. Cook's writing demonstrates how Canada's inability to reconcile with and acknowledge their oppression of Native voices and make reparations greatly impacted the liberatory practice of survivors. In a broader sense, scholars have demonstrated that felt power can be located anywhere, and that inspiration for decolonization lies with it.

== Related theories ==
In the learning of felt theory, an integral text that aids in a deeper understanding of Million's musings is the somewhat ubiquitous collection of essays "This Bridge Called My Back: Writings by Radical Women of Color", originally published and edited by Gloria Anzaldúa and Cherríe Moraga in 1981. The collection focuses on the experiences of BIPOC women and transnational feminism. In the book, Moraga makes claims on intersecting identities with her revolutionary "theory of the flesh", which aims to incorporate and honor all of the experiences and things that make us who we are in order to comprehend trauma. In describing her theory, she says that “a theory in the flesh means one where the physical realities of our lives—our skin color, the land or concrete we grew up on, our sexual longings—all fuse to create a politic born out of necessity”.

Connecting directly to felt theory, a theory in the flesh presents a nearly identical perspective that stands testament to one's experiences, feelings, and trauma—setting the stage for Dian Million and other scholars to develop felt theory in a way that was ultra-accessible.

== See also ==
- Transnational feminism
- Indigenous feminism
- Diaspora
- Global feminism
- Human rights
- Postcolonial feminism
- Feminist theory
- Intersectionality
- Dian Million
- Survivance
