= One Million Dollars =

One Million Dollars may refer to:

- Hard Time for Princes or One Million Dollars, a 1965 Italian comedy film
- One Million Dollars, a 1915 film by John W. Noble
- "One Million Dollars", a 2023 song by 100 Gecs from 10,000 Gecs

== See also ==
- Dr. Evil, a fictional character who holds the world ransom for $1 million
- Million dollar bill
- Millionaire (disambiguation)
- One million (disambiguation)
- Dollar (disambiguation)
