= Millions =

A million is 1,000,000.

Millions or Million may refer to:

== Films ==
- Millions (1936 film), a British comedy film
- Millions (1991 film), an English-language Italian drama
- Millions (2004 film), a British comedy-drama
- A Million, a 2009 South Korean thriller

== Music ==
=== Performers ===
- Millions (band), an American noise rock band formed in 2006
- The Millions (band), an American alternative rock band, active 1989–1995 and from 2012
- Russ Millions, stage name of British rapper Shylo Milwood (born 1996)
- Million Stylez, stage name of Swedish dancehall artist Kenshin Iryo (born 1981)

=== Songs ===
- "Millions" (Pusha T song), by Pusha T
- "Millions" (Winner song), a song by South Korean band Winner
- "Millions", a song by Gerard Way from the 2014 album Hesitant Alien
- "Millions", a song by KSI from the 2020 album Dissimulation
- "Millions", a song by STRFKR from the 2011 album Reptilians
- "Millions", a song by XTC from their 1979 album Drums and Wires

== People ==
- Dian Million, American professor
- Million Manhoef (born 2002), Dutch footballer
- Ten Million (1889–1964), minor league baseball player

== Other uses ==
- Millions (novel), British children's book based on the 2004 movie
- The Travels of Marco Polo or The Million, a transcription by Rustichello da Pisa of Marco Polo's travels between 1271 and 1298
- Million, Kentucky, a community in the United States
- Arlington Million, an American Thoroughbred horse race
- Million Lottery or Million Adventure, the first English state lottery, launched in 1694

== See also ==
- Milíon
- One million (disambiguation)
