= Betty David =

Native American fashion designer

- Betty David dressing a mannequin
- Born: 1938; Nespelem, Washington
- Died: August 31, 2007 (aged 68–69)
- Education: University of Oregon; Marylhurst University
- Occupation: fashion designer

Betty David (1938 – August 31, 2007) was a Native American fashion designer renowned for her handmade coats and leather goods.

David was born in Nespelem, Washington; she attended the University of Oregon and Marylhurst College. She was enrolled as a member of the Spokane Tribe of Indians, Wellpinit, Washington.

In the 1970s, she received a shearling coat as a gift and decided she could design a better one. She first began selling her hand-sewn coats decorated with painted designs in, in David's own words, "Northwest Coast Indian style," at the Santa Fe Art Market. She had a loft studio in Seattle's Pioneer Square and had a traveling trunk show. She later sold her work at galleries in Spokane and New York City and received attention in major publications.

Her work was acquired by the Heard Museum in Phoenix, Arizona, the Gichigamiin Indigenous Nations Museum in Evanston, Illinois and the Smithsonian National Museum of the American Indian.

David described her designs as bridging the divide between nature and abstraction: "'I'm inspired by animals and parts of animals, but I'm not trying to make critters. They're abstract ... It's a new totem pole look.'"
