= The Millionaire =

The Millionaire or The Millionairess or The Millionaires may refer to:

== Stage and screen ==
- The Millionaire (1917 film), a silent comedy film featuring Oliver Hardy
- The Millionaire (1921 film), an American silent drama film
- The Millionaire (1927 film), directed by Oscar Micheaux
- The Millionaire (1931 film), a comedy film starring George Arliss
- The Millionaire (1947 film), a German comedy film
- The Millionaire (1950 film), an Egyptian comedy film
- The Millionaire (TV series), a 1955–1960 television drama anthology series
- The Millionaire, a 1978 TV movie starring Martin Balsam, based on the TV series
  - The Millionairess (play), a 1936 play by George Bernard Shaw
  - The Millionairess, a 1960 romantic comedy starring Peter Sellers and Sophia Loren

== Music ==
- The Millionaires (band), a Dutch pop group
- Millionaires (duo), an American electronic music duo
- "The Millionaire", member of musical group Combustible Edison
- "The Millionaire", a 1975 song by the band Dr. Hook

== Other uses ==
- The Millionaire (calculator), a 19th-century mechanical calculator
- The Millionaires, a 2002 novel by Brad Meltzer
- Thurston Howell III, a character on the U.S. television sitcom Gilligan's Island

== See also ==
- Millionaire (disambiguation)
