= Multi-Millionaire =

Multi-Millionaire may refer to:

- a multi-millionaire or multimillionairess, someone whose personal fortune is several million in the currency in question, frequently referring to the amount calculated using U.S. Dollars
- "Multi Millionaire" (song), a 2019 song by Lil Pump off the album Havard Dropout
- Who Wants to Marry a Multi-Millionaire?, a U.S. reality TV competition dating show, also called "Multi-Millionaire"

== See also ==
- Super Millionaire (disambiguation)
- Millionaire (disambiguation)
