= Midnite Mine =

Uranium mine in Washington, United States

- Superfund site
- Location within Washington (state)
- Location: Wellpinit, Stevens County, Washington; 47°56′30″N 118°05′35″W

Information
- CERCLIS ID: WAD980978753
- Contaminants: Metals and radionuclides

Progress
- Proposed: February 16, 1999
- Listed: May 11, 2000
- Construction completed: 2024 (planned)

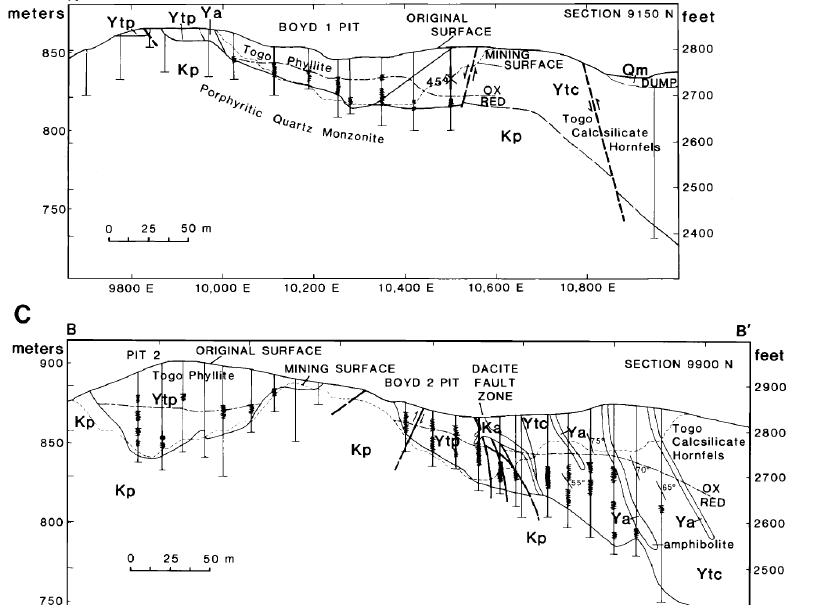
Midnite Mine geological cross sections, where Kp is the pluton.

The Midnite Mine is an inactive uranium mine in the Selkirk Mountains of the state of Washington that operated from 1955 to 1965 and again from 1968 to 1981. Located within the reservation of the Spokane Tribe of Indians, it is approximately 8 miles (13 km) from Wellpinit, Stevens County. The mine was listed as a Superfund site under the Comprehensive Environmental Response, Compensation, and Liability Act of 1980 (CERCLA) on May 11, 2000. In addition to elevated levels of radioactivity, heavy metals mobilized in uranium acid mine drainage pose a potential threat to human health and the environment.

== Geology ==
Uranium at the Midnite Mine occurs in discordant deposits in crystalline host rocks. Ore bodies are in metamorphosed steeply dipping Precambrian pelitic and calcareous rocks of a roof pendant adjacent to a Cretaceous porphyritic quartz monzonite pluton.

The uranium deposits are generally tabular with dimensions ranging up to 1,250 feet (380 m) long, 690 feet (210 m) wide and 165 feet (50 m) thick. Deposits are bounded on at least one side by unmineralized granitic rock. The thickest mineralized zones invariably occur at depressions or flexures in the granitic contact.

Shallow ore is mainly autunite. Deeper ore is pitchblende and coffinite with abundant pyrite and marcasite. Uranium minerals occur disseminated along foliation, as replacements and stockwork fracture-fillings. There is no stratigraphic control of ore deposition. Most ores are muscovite schist and mica phyllite, with some deposits in calc-silicate hornfels. Uranium minerals were deposited over time from late Cretaceous to late Tertiary.

== Discovery and mining ==
In 1954 brothers Jim and John LeBret, members of the Spokane Tribe, found uranium on the tribal reservation in Washington state. The brothers and several other tribal members formed Midnite Mines, Inc. and secured mining leases administered by the United States Bureau of Indian Affairs. Midnite Mines then joined with Newmont USA Limited, a U.S. mining conglomerate, to form the mine operator Dawn Mining Company (DMC), with Newmont as 51% shareholder and Midnite Mines owning 49%.

Uranium ore was transported from the Midnite Mine to DMC's mill 25 miles (40 km) east of the mine near Ford, Washington, outside the reservation boundary. Mining produced approximately 2.9 million tons of ore averaging 0.23 percent uranium oxide. 2.4 million tons of stockpiled low-grade ore, containing about 2 million pounds of uranium oxide, and 33 million tons of waste rock were retained on site.

== Environmental reclamation ==
Two exposed pits, back-filled pits, waste rock piles, and low-grade ore stockpiles remain on site. Contaminated water surfacing below waste rock and ore stockpiles is collected and treated on-site at a water treatment plant, then discharged into Blue Creek, which enters the Spokane Arm of Franklin D. Roosevelt Lake.

In 2001, the State of Washington decided that a ground water pump-back system was no longer effective in reducing contamination. It directed DMC to prepare a Corrective Action Assessment of remediation alternatives. The final cleanup plan for the site, projected to cost approximately $193 million, was issued in a Record of Decision on 29 September 2006, which called for a cap over the area of pits back-filled with waste during mining, consolidation and containment of the remaining waste within the two remnant open pits, removal of water entering the pits, and operation of a treatment system to treat contaminated water from the pits and seeps. In 2007, ground water tests had commenced.

The EPA finalised a Consent Decree in January 2012, with DMC and Newmont to complete the cleanup work, and the federal government contributing a share of the cleanup costs. The EPA will oversee the cleanup work in coordination with the Spokane Tribe. Dawn and Newmont completed the engineering design of the cleanup works in October 2015.

In May 2016 site preparation works for the environmental cleanup began, including installation of contractor facilities, access road construction and stockpile relocation. The major components of the cleanup are planned for the period from 2017 to 2024.

== See also ==
- List of Superfund sites in Washington (state)
