= Coles Hill uranium deposit =

Ore body in Pittsylvania County, Virginia, USA

The Coles Hill uranium deposit is located in Pittsylvania County, Virginia, in the Smith River allochthon of southern Virginia. The deposit is located east of US Highway 29 between the towns of Chatham and Gretna, Virginia, divided into a north and south ore body. A part of Virginia's Western Piedmont Province, the uranium deposit is bounded by the Chatham fault to the east, where it borders the Triassic Danville basin. Uranium minerals are found in the footwall of the Chatham fault, in healed fractures where apatite crystallized from high-temperature hydrothermal water in the Leatherwood granite mylonite. The site was discovered during uranium prospecting in the 1970s, inspired by the Ambrosia Lake deposit in Canada, with exploration led by the Marline Oil Corporation.

Uranium is found within a structural trap, surrounded by biotite gneiss, with staining from hematite overlying the Fork Mountain schist. Hematite staining on the ground surface is related to the weathering of the Fork Mountain schist. The exact origin of this uranium deposit is unclear. One model suggests that uranium was dissolved and "mobilized" from the neighboring Triassic basin by rainwater, while a different interpretation suggests mineralization occurred because of hydrothermal fluids flowing through the rock during the emplacement and cooling of the Leatherwood granite.

== See also ==
- Uranium mining in the United States#Virginia
