= Spokane people =

Native American tribe in Washington State, U.S.

Spokane
snxʷmeneʔ
- Tribal logo

Total population
- 2,900

Regions with significant populations
- Washington, United States

Languages
- English, Salish

Religion
- Dreamer Faith, traditional tribal religion, Christianity

Related ethnic groups
- Bitterroot Salish, Coeur d'Alene, Kutenai, Kalispel, and other Interior Salish tribes

Location of the Spokane Indian Reservation

The Spokane people (/spoʊˈkæn/ spoh-KAN; Spokane: snxʷmeneʔ) are a Native American people indigenous to eastern Washington state, United States.

Spokane people are enrolled in the Spokane Tribe of Indians, a federally recognized tribe headquartered in Wellpinit, Washington (sčecuwe). The tribe governs the Spokane Indian Reservation, which includes about 237 square miles (610 km^{2}) in eastern Washington between the Columbia and Spokane rivers.

The traditional language of the Spokane is Salish, an Interior Salishan language spoken from Washington to Montana. They speak the Spokane dialect.

== Name ==
The name of the Spokane people in their language, Salish, is snxʷmeneʔ. The name snxʷmeneʔ means "steelhead."

The name Spokane is first recorded in 1807. According to George Gibbs, the name was used by the Coeur d'Alene for one specific band of the Spokane, later transferred to all allied bands.

A number of possible interpretations of the name have been proposed. Most frequently, the name has been translated as "Sun children", "Children of the Sun", or "Muddy people". According to Pritzker (2011), these interpretations are most probably popular etymologies (or "faulty translations") derived from an actual self-designation of Spoqe'ind, meaning "round head." The interpretation of "children of the Sun" was reported by Thomas Symons (1882), who attributed it to Ross Cox (1831), who mentioned the name of a chief in the region as Illim-Spokanée "Son of the Sun". The word for "Sun" is recorded as spukani for Bitterroot Salish, but as sokemm in Okanagan, and as ałdarench in Coeur d'Alene, all members of the Interior Salish branch of Salish.

The city of Spokane, Washington (sƛ̓x̣etkʷ) is named after the tribe. It developed along the Spokane River, within the historic ancestral land of the tribe, but not within the reservation.

== Classfication ==
The Spokane are an Indigenous people of the Plateau.

=== Subgroups ===
The Spokane were traditionally divided into three bands: the Lower, Middle, and Upper Spokane.

- The Lower Spokane (scqesciɬni, lit. 'fishery') were located on the Spokane River, with their primary settlement being located near Little Falls.
- The Middle Spokane (snxʷmeneʔ) were located on the Little Spokane River (snxʷmeneʔm, 'steelhead place').
- The Upper Spokane (sntuʔtʔulixʷ) were located on Latah Creek, with their primary settlement (ntuʔtʔulmetkʷ) being located at its confluence with the Spokane River.

The Middle Spokane and Upper Spokane considered themselves "all one people" compared to the Lower Spokane. Some classifications label the sntuʔtʔulixʷ the Middle Spokane and the snxʷmeneʔ the Upper Spokane.

== History ==
For thousands of years the Spokane people lived near the Spokane River in the territory of present-day eastern Washington and northern Idaho, surviving by hunting and gathering. Spokane territory once sprawled over three million acres (12,000 km²) of land. The Spokane bands were semi nomadic, following game and plants on a seasonal basis for nine months of the year, and settling in permanent winter villages for the other three.

The precontact population of the Spokane people is estimated to be about 1,400 to 2,500 people. The populations of the tribe began to diminish after contact with Euro-American settlers and traders due to mortality from new infectious diseases endemic among the Europeans, and to which the Spokane had no acquired immunity. By 1829 a Hudson's Bay Company trader estimated there were about 700 Spokane people in the area. Since the early 20th century, their population has been steadily increasing: in 1985 tribal enrolled citizenship was reported as 1,961. In 2019, the tribe reported its population to be around 2,900 people.

The first Europeans whom the Spokane people had contact with were fur traders and explorers. The Lewis and Clark Expedition encountered the Spokane tribe in 1805. Already the Spokane people were dwindling in population from introduced Eurasian diseases, such as smallpox, which were endemic among Europeans. Shortly after the encounter with the Lewis and Clark Expedition, fur traders and settlers arrived. In 1810, the North West Company opened the Spokane House near the confluence of the Spokane and Little Spokane (Nxweme'a'tkxy - "river where the Steelhead trout run") rivers as a trade post. The Pacific Fur Company established Fort Spokane (Čˈłyaqˈ) in 1811. Much later, the structure was used as an Indian boarding school for the Spokane children, from 1898 to 1906. The Spokane took prominent part in the so called Coeur d'Alene War (Spokane-Coeur d'Alene-Pend d'oreille-Paloos War) of 1858, a series of encounters between the allied Native American tribes of the Skitswish (Coeur d'Alene), Kalispel (Pend'Oreille), Spokane, Palouse and Northern Paiute against United States Army forces in Washington and Idaho which centered in ancestral Spokane territories.

A treaty for the Spokane people could not be established due to Governor Isaac Stevens' failure to return to the tribe to negotiate the Treaty. This was due to the Yakama Wars between 1855 and 1858. By executive order by President Rutherford B Hayes, between the federal government and the tribe, the people ceded most of their territory, accepting removal to the Spokane Reservation, which was established in 1881. In 1877, the Lower Spokane people (Scqesciłni) agreed to move to the Spokane Reservation. In 1887, the Upper (sntuʔtʔulixʷ) and Middle Spokane people (snxʷmeneʔ) agreed to move to the Colville Reservation predominately inhabited by the Colville people (Sxʷyelpetkʷ). Not all the Spokane people moved from their traditional territory, which caused some conflict with white settlers. In the Coeur d'Alene War of 1858, the Spokane had allied with the Coeur d'Alene (Sčicwˈi), Yakima (Yiʔaqmeʔ), Palouse, and Paiute peoples against the European Americans. In the Nez Perce War of 1877, they remained neutral despite pleas from Nez Perce (Saʕaptni) chief Chief Joseph to join him in trying to expel the settlers. Prior to colonization by European-Americans, Chewelah was home to a band of the Kalispel people. The band was known as the slet̓éw̓si, meaning "valley people". The Chewelah Band of Indians is currently part of the Spokane Tribe.

=== Post–World War II history ===
Around the 1950s, uranium was discovered on the reservation. With the development of nuclear weapons and other tools, it was considered highly valuable. It was mined (under leases arranged on behalf of the Spokane by the federal government) from 1956 to 1962 out of an open pit. This practice was ended, and from 1969 to 1982, uranium was mined at the Midnite Mine. The now inactive mine is on the list of Superfund cleanup sites, as the mining process left the grounds and underground water highly contaminated by metals, radionucleides and acidic drainage.

The creation of dams on the Spokane and related waterways, to generate hydroelectric power and provide water for irrigation in the arid eastern part of the state, has also affected the Spokane people. Construction of the Little Falls dam resulted in the end of most of the salmon run at Spokane Falls. The Grand Coulee Dam, on the Columbia River, blocked salmon from migrating upriver and ended all salmon runs on the Spokane River.

The tribe owns the Mistequa Casino Hotel (previously known as the Chewelah Casino) in Chewelah, which opened in 1993, and the Spokane Tribe Resort and Casino in Airway Heights, which opened in 2018.

The Spokane Tribe is one of several tribal governments in the northwestern United States to offer free bus service on its reservation.

== Culture ==
=== Organization ===
The Spokane tribe was divided into three geographic divisions, Upper, Lower, and Middle. Each area was divided into bands, which were composed of groups of related families or kin groups.

Individual bands were led by a Ilmixʷm or chief and a sub chief, who were both selected to lead based on their leadership qualities. Decisions were made by consensus of the group.

The Spokane had a matrilocal custom, in which the husband of a Spokane woman, after marriage, would join her and her people as the site of their home together. Occasionally, the wife would move to the husband's people. There was mobility between bands, by which a person or family could spend one winter with a band and the next winter with another.

=== Lifestyle ===
The Spokane diet consisted of fish, local game, and plants, including nuts and roots. The men hunted whitetail deer and mule deer, which provided essential protein and other nutrients in the winter. Individual hunters would track the deer and kill them using a bow and arrow. Fish, especially salmon, were a huge part of the Spokane diet and also a large part of the trade economy. The Spokane people also ate trout and whitefish. They would smoke or dry the fish for trade or for storage in winter. Fish eyes were considered delicacies. Plants gathered by women provided nearly half of the caloric intake for the Spokane tribe.

=== Gender roles ===
Men of the Spokane tribe created tools, fished, and hunted. After the tribe acquired horses, the men cared for and trained these animals, and horses became a measure of wealth. The animals allowed the people to travel wider territories, and were used also to carry or pull their supplies. The men rode the horses during hunting and warfare. Horses were introduced to the Spokane tribe from either the Nez Perce, Kalispel, or Flathead tribe. By about 1800, the Spokane tribe was acquiring herds, showing that they had fully embraced use of these animals.

Spokane women made coiled baskets out of birch bark (or from cedar roots). They wove wallets and bags from strips of processed animal hide. They would also sew mats and other items which were sometimes traded with other Native peoples and white traders and settlers. Some of the plants they gathered were camas roots and local berries and barks. The women used digging sticks to uproot and gather their food. It was a fundamental tool for their lives, and it was a rite of passage for young girls to be given their first digging sticks. Women's graves were often marked with these sticks.

=== Religion ===
A Spokane religion was the Dreamer Cult, also called Washani, meaning "worship" or "dancers". It developed in the Columbia Plateau tribes and emerged from the pressures of colonization during the second half of the nineteenth century.

The Dreamer Cult developed as a mix of traditional spirituality and aspects of Christianity. The Dreamer prophets rejected non-Native culture and belief systems. The prophets advocated returning to traditional ways of life. "[P]rior to contact, Plateau Indian spirituality revolved around a complex of Winter dances, personal vision quests, and seasonal feasts tied to the annual subsistence cycle and the acquisition of guardian spirit powers"(Fisher).

A few examples of spiritual dances include the Prophet Dance and the Spirit Dance, which took place in mid-January. Dancers sought to identify with the Prophet's spirit. In the Spirit Dance a shaman would call upon the spirit to visit an individual.

It is believed the prophet Smohalla in a vision

foresaw the disappearance of the whites, the resurrection of the Indian dead, and the restoration of the world to a pristine state. This millennial transformation required no acts of violence — indeed, most Dreamers counseled pacifism — but to achieve it, the Indians had to obey the instructions of the Creator as conveyed through the prophets[.]

—Andrew H. Fisher, Encyclopedia of American Indian History

The Dreamer Cult remained prominent within the Columbia Plateau peoples until the early 1890s, when the major prophets died and their followers began to lose faith in the promise of a world free of white people. The closest contemporary religion to the Washani is the Seven Drums Religion.

== Mythology ==
=== Stories ===
- "Spokane Lake of Long Ago" told by Chief Lot
- "The Origin of the Spokane River"

=== Creation story ===
The Creator, Amotkan made light only after all the animals had congregated to create it for Woodpecker up it, but the pole was too hot for him. They next sent Coyote up the pole. But he was too noisy, all the time shouting down to his children. Bear volunteered, but he found it too cold atop the pole. The sound of thunder shattered their efforts then. It loosened a piece of red rock, which turned into a handsome red man. He wanted a brother, so Amotkan gave him one made from the root of an herb called spowaunch. The two brothers went to a lodge occupied by a witch, Lady Bullfrog. She became so enamored of the brother formed of the root that she leaped onto his face—and stuck there. In pulling loose, she tore out one of his eyes. He then volunteered to ascend into the sky to be light for the earth, for he did not want people to see his face, now missing one eye. Thus, he became the sun, and when people looked at him, they had to close one of their own eyes. The other man joined his lonely brother in the sky. But before he did so, Lady Bullfrog had jumped onto his face, too. He became the moon. Today, if one looks carefully at the moon, one can see Lady Bullfrog clinging to his face. Because he was lonesome, Coyote, after several failures, made Spokane man… Coyote then mixed all these elements together [pitch, clay, hot rock, and reeds] and—adding berries, smoke, and fire—created the Spokane man. With these same elements, he created Spokane woman, and Amotkan, the Creator, gave her life. Man and woman soon became wild, caring little for the safety of the others who had sprung from them. A flood came then and covered the land, destroying all except a few people. The survivors banded together for safety, elected a leader, and multiplied. In time, the leader divided the people into small groups. They became the various tribes. — Spokane creation mythos as retold in The Spokane Indians: Children of the Sun (Ruby)

== External relations ==
The Spokane were in loose alliance with other Plateau tribes and sometimes the Kutenai (Sqlˈse), Crow Nation (Stemčiʔ) and Cree-Assiniboine (Iron Confederacy) (Ncoʕʷaqs) joined in fights about against their common enemies, the Blackfoot Confederacy (Sčqˈʷišni) and later Lakota people (Hułnʔixʷtˈusm) on the east.

== Notable Spokane people ==
- Sherman Alexie (Spokane–Coeur d'Alene), author and filmmaker
- Gloria Bird, poet and scholar
- Betty David, fashion designer
- Chief Garry or Spokane Garry, (Spokan name: Slough-Keetcha), 19th-century Middle Spokane tribal leader and later of the Upper Spokane tribe too, diplomat and spokesman
- Charlene Teters, artist and anti-mascot activist

== See also ==
- The Absolutely True Diary of a Part-Time Indian (book)
- Coeur d'Alene War (aka the Spokane War)
- Spokane Indians (baseball team)
