= Uranium mining in the United States =

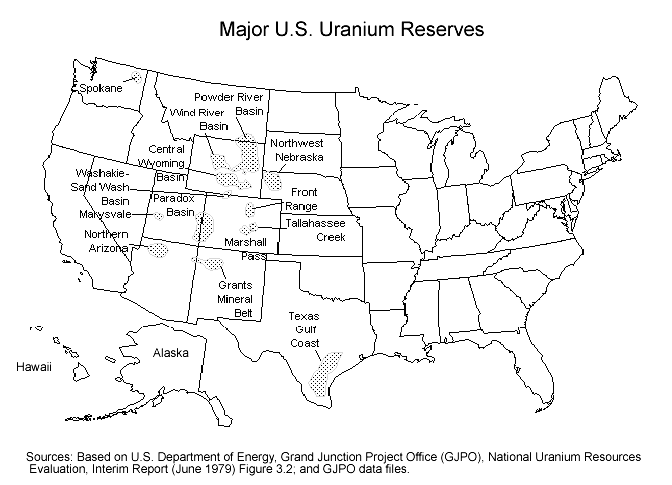
Map of US Uranium Districts (1979).

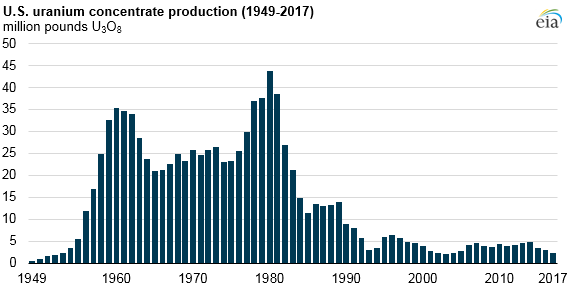
Production of uranium concentrate in the United States, 1949–2017

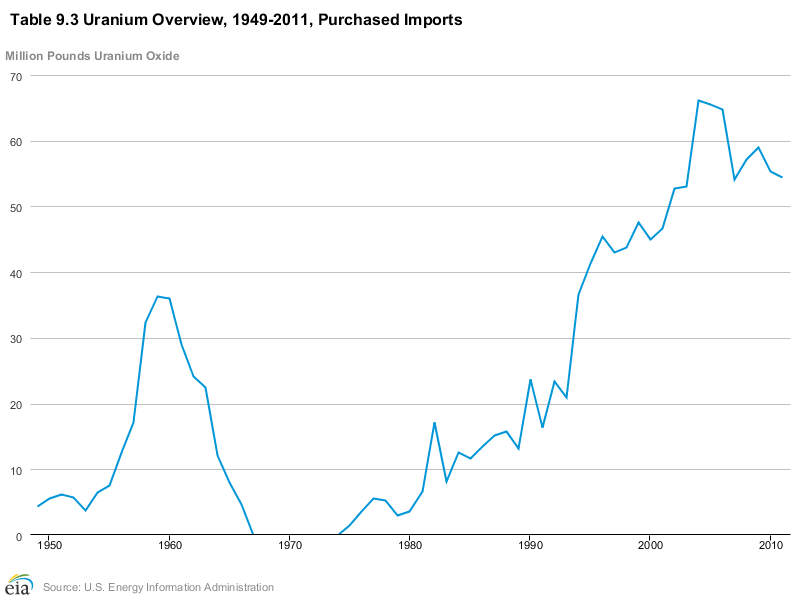
Uranium imported into the United States, 1949–2011

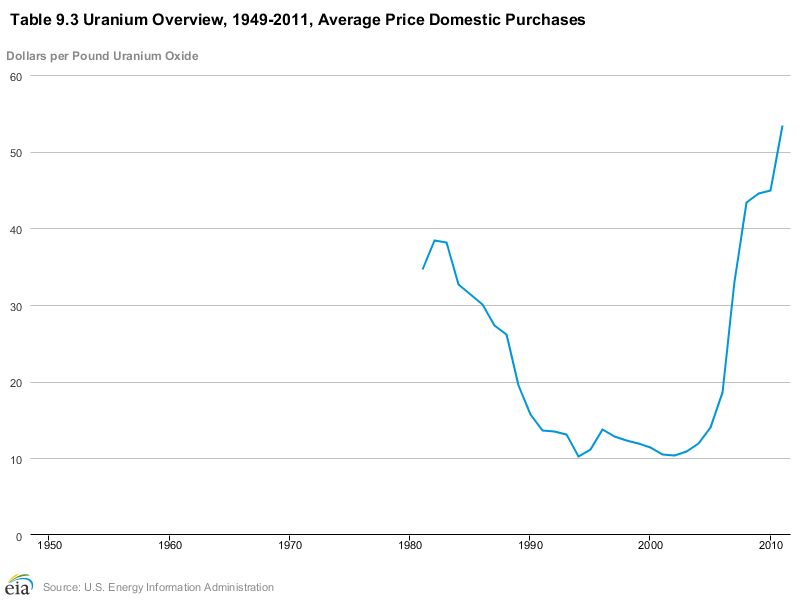
Price of uranium concentrate, 1981–2011

Uranium mining in the United States produced 224,331 pounds (101.8 tonnes) of U_{3}O_{8} in 2023, 15% of the 2018 production of 1,447,945 pounds (656.8 tonnes) of U_{3}O_{8}. The 2023 production represents 0.4% of the uranium fuel requirements of the US's nuclear power reactors for the year. Production came from five in-situ leaching plants, four in Wyoming (Nichols Ranch ISR Project, Lance Project, Lost Creek Project, and Smith Ranch-Highland Operation) and one in Nebraska (Crowe Butte Operation); and from the White Mesa conventional mill in Utah.

From 1949 to 2019, total US production of uranium oxide (U_{3}O_{8}) was 979.9 million pounds (444,500 tonnes).

== History ==
While uranium is used primarily for nuclear power, uranium mining had its roots in the production of radium-bearing ore from 1898 from the mining of uranium-vanadium sandstone deposits in western Colorado. The 1950s saw a boom in uranium mining in the western U.S., spurred by the fortunes made by prospectors such as Charlie Steen. The United States was the world's leading producer of uranium from 1953 until 1980. In 1980 annual U.S. production peaked at 43.7 million pounds of U_{3}O_{8}. Until the early 1980s, there were active uranium mines in Arizona, Colorado, New Mexico, Oregon, South Dakota, Texas, Utah, Washington and Wyoming.

Price declines in the late 1970s and early 1980s forced the closure of numerous mines. Most uranium ore in the United States comes from deposits in sandstone, which tend to be of lower grade than those of Australia and Canada. Because of the lower grade, many uranium deposits in the United States became uneconomic when the price of uranium declined sharply in the late 1970s. By 2001, there were only three operating uranium mines (all in-situ leaching operations) in the United States. Annual production reached a low of 779 metric tons of uranium oxide in 2003, but then more than doubled in three years to 1672 metric tons in 2006, from 10 mines. The U.S. DOE's Energy Information Administration reported that 90% of U.S. uranium production in 2006 came from in-situ leaching.

The average spot price of uranium oxide (U_{3}O_{8}) increased from $7.92 per pound in 2001 to $39.48 per pound ($87.04/kg) in 2006. In 2011 the United States mined 9% of the uranium consumed by its nuclear power plants. The remainder was imported, principally from Russia and Kazakhstan (38%), Canada, and Australia. Although uranium production has declined to low levels, the United States has the fourth-largest uranium resource in the world, behind Australia, Canada, and Kazakhstan. United States uranium reserves are strongly dependent on price. At $50 per pound U_{3}O_{8}, reserves are estimated to be 539 million pounds; however, at a price of $100 per pound, reserves are an estimated 1227 million pounds. Rising uranium prices since 2001 have increased interest in uranium mining in Arizona, Colorado, Texas and Utah. The states with the largest known uranium ore reserves (not counting byproduct uranium from phosphate) are (in order) Wyoming, New Mexico, and Colorado.

The radiation hazards of uranium mining and milling were not appreciated in the early years thereod, resulting in workers being exposed to high levels of radiation. Radon gas is a colorless, odorless, radioactive gas that forms naturally from the decay of radioactive elements like uranium, found in rocks and soil. Inhalation of radon gas caused sharp, consistent increases in lung cancers among underground uranium miners employed in the 1940s and 1950s. In 1950, the US Public Health service began a comprehensive study of uranium miners, leading to the first publication of a statistical correlation between cancer and uranium mining, released in 1962. In 1969, the federal government regulated the standard amount of radon in mines. In 1990, Congress passed the Radiation Exposure Compensation Act (RECA), granting compensation for those affected by mining. Out of 50 present and former uranium milling sites in 12 states, 24 have been abandoned and are the responsibility of the US Department of Energy.

== By state ==
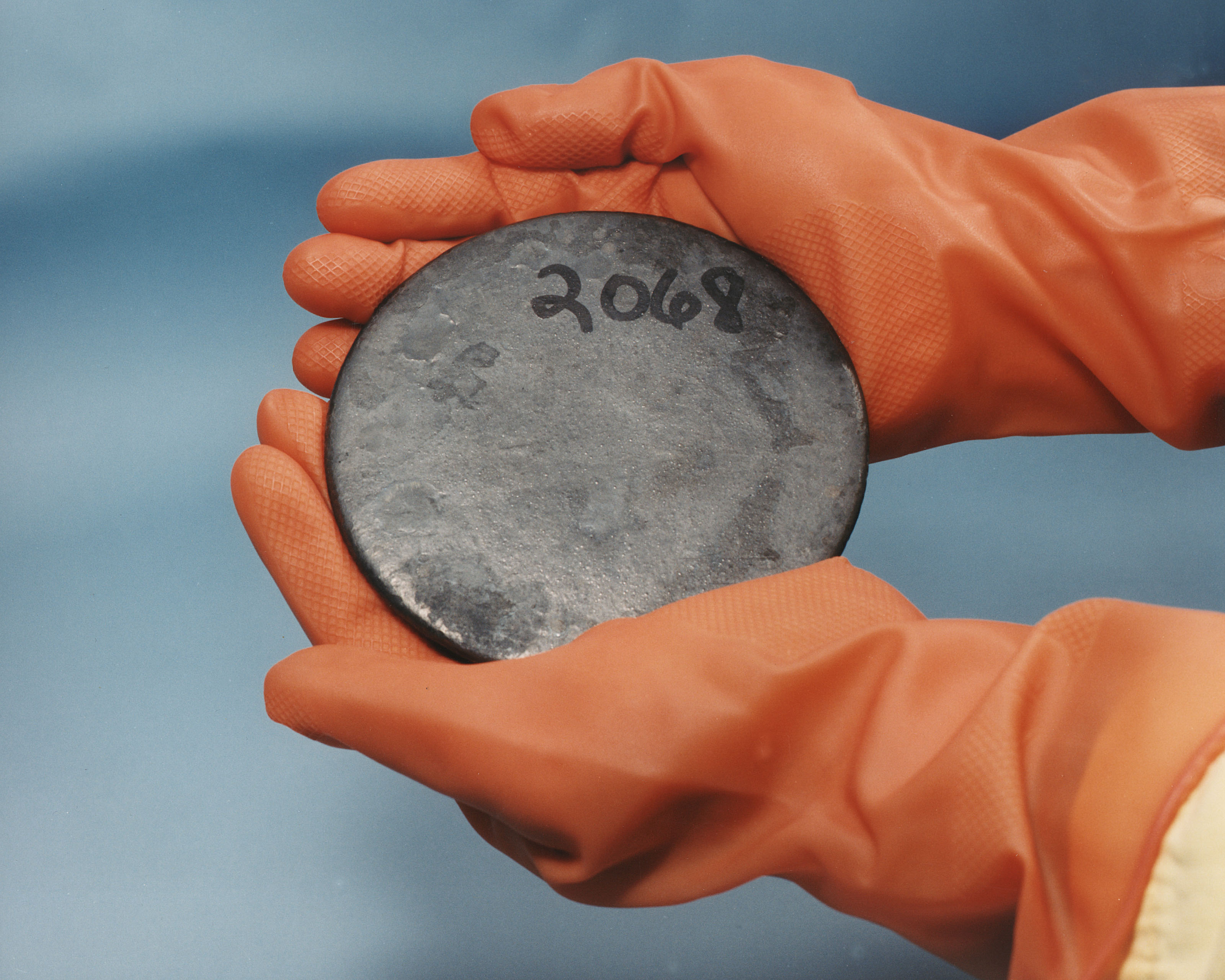
A billet of highly enriched uranium.

=== Alabama ===
Uranium in Alabama is found in the Coosa Block of the Northern Alabama Piedmont. Metamorphic uranium occurrences have been found in the Higgins Ferry Group in Coosa and Clay Counties. Some exploration has been done, but no economic deposits have been found to date.

=== Alaska ===
Alaska's only uranium mine, Ross-Adams, was discovered in 1955 by an airborne gamma radiation survey. The deposit is on the side of Bokan Mountain on Prince of Wales Island. The principal ore mineral is uranothorite, which occurs in veinlets in granite. Accessory minerals are primarily hematite and calcite, with lesser amounts of fluorite, pyrite, galena, quartz, and rare earth minerals. Mining commenced in 1957, when approximately 18,000 tonnes of thorium-bearing uranium ore grading 1% U_{3}O_{8} was recovered from an open pit. Additional mining took place in 1961–1962 (6800 tonnes of ore), 1963 (10,880 tonnes), and 49,885 tonnes from 1968–1971 from underground operations. A total of 1.3 million pounds of U_{3}O_{8} at a grade of 0.76% was produced from open pit and underground operations, with milling taking place in Washington and Utah.

=== Arizona ===
Uranium mining in Arizona has taken place since 1918. Prior to the uranium boom of the late 1940s, uranium in Arizona was a byproduct of vanadium mining of the mineral carnotite.

=== California ===
Uranium was discovered in 1954 in the Sierra Nevada of Kern County, along the Kern River about 30 miles (50 km) northeast of Bakersfield. Two mines, the Kergon mine and the Miracle mine, made small shipments in 1954 and 1955. Uranium occurs as uraninite and autunite in shear zones in granodiorite. Accessory minerals include fluorite and the molybdenum minerals ilsemannite and jordisite.

=== Colorado ===
The first uranium identified in the US was pitchblende from the Wood gold mine at Central City, Colorado in 1871. Uranium mining in southwest Colorado goes back to 1898. The Uravan district of Colorado and Utah supplied about half the world's radium from 1910 to 1922, and vanadium and uranium were byproducts. The last producing uranium mine in the state, the Topaz Mine, part of the Sunday Complex near Uravan, Colorado, was closed down on March 18, 2009, by then owner Denison Mines due to depressed uranium prices. On July 6, 2021 Western Uranium & Vanadium Corp announced the resumption of mining activities at the Sunday Mine Complex. On February 14, 2022 Western Uranium & Vanadium Corp announced 2,000 tons of new production was moved into four separate underground stockpiles.

=== Florida ===
The Central Florida (Bone Valley) phosphorite deposits are considered to contain the largest known uranium resource (one million metric tons of uranium oxide) in North America (but note that resources are not the same as ore reserves). Uranium has been produced as a byproduct of phosphate mining and the production of phosphoric acid fertilizer. The uranium is contained in the phosphate minerals francolite, crandallite, millisite, wavellite, and vivianite, found in Miocene and Pliocene sediments of the Bone Valley Formation. The average uranium content is 0.009%, which is considered to be low grade. Concentrations of uranium in this type of deposit typically grade to 0.01–0.015% U_{3}O_{8}. Recovery process costs are estimated at $22 to $54 per pound of U_{3}O_{8}; higher than the market price of uranium during the 25-year period spanning the 1980s through the early first decade of the 21st century. Consequently, uranium recovery from Florida phosphate ceased in 1998.

=== Idaho ===
From 1955 to 1960, uranium was extracted from placer black sand deposits derived from the Idaho Batholith in southwest Idaho. The deposits were mined for uranium, thorium, and rare earths. Uranium and thorium were in the monazite grains; rare earths were in columbite and euxenite. Production was 365,000 pounds (165 metric tons) of U_{3}O_{8}.

Uranium was mined at the Stanley district in Custer County, Idaho from 1957 to 1962. Deposits occur as veins in granite of the Cretaceous Idaho Batholith, and in strataform deposits in possibly Paleocene arkosic conglomerates and sandstones between the underlying Idaho Batholith and overlying Challis Volcanic Group (Eocene). The USGS has estimated production to be less than 170,000 pounds (78 metric tons) of U_{3}O_{8}.

=== Nebraska ===
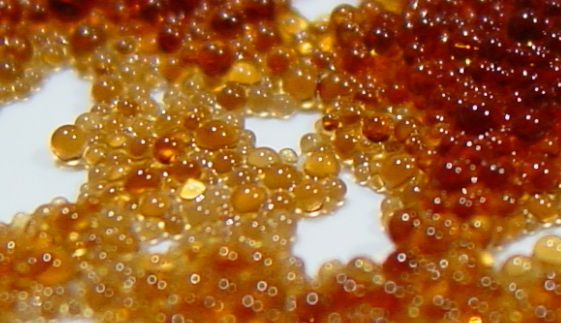
Ion exchange resin beads

The only operating uranium mine in Nebraska is the Crow Butte mine, operated by Cameco. The mine is five miles (8.0 km) southeast of Crawford in Dawes County, western Nebraska. The roll-front deposit in the Oligocene Chadron formation was discovered in 1980 by Wyoming Fuel Co. Commercial operation began in 1991. Uranium is mined by in-situ leaching which involves the extraction by boreholes of uranium-bearing (U_{3}O_{8}) water, which is then filtered through resin beads. Through an ion exchange process, the resin beads attract uranium from the solution. Uranium loaded resins are then transported to a processing plant, where U_{3}O_{8} is separated from the resin beads and yellowcake is produced. The resin beads are returned to the ion exchange facility where they are reused.

=== Nevada ===
There is no current uranium production from Nevada. The largest past-producer was the Apex mine (also called Rundberg or Early Day mine), three miles south of Austin, in Lander County. Discovered in September 1953, it was first mined as a silver deposit and produced 45 metric tons of U_{3}O_{8} (80% of Nevada's historical production) from 1954 until 1966, from a small open pit and from underground. Ore was shipped to Utah and to Lakeview, Oregon for processing. Uranium occurs as the secondary minerals autunite and meta-autunite after uraninite and coffinite in fractured Cambrian metamorphosed shales and quartzite, at or near the contact with Jurassic porphyritic quartz monzonite. The Apex-Lowboy deposit has an inferred resource of 615,000 metric tons at a grade of 0.07% U_{3}O_{8}.

The McDermitt Caldera in Humboldt County was the site of intensive uranium exploration in the late 1970s. In 2006 and 2007, Western Uranium Corporation drilled exploratory boreholes in the Kings Valley area.

=== New Jersey ===
A uranium exploration project in northern New Jersey was halted in 1980 when the local government passed an ordinance preventing uranium mining after protests in Jefferson Township.

=== New Mexico ===
New Mexico was a significant uranium producer since the discovery of uranium by Navajo sheepherder Paddy Martinez in 1950. Uranium in New Mexico is almost all in the Grants mineral belt, along the south margin of the San Juan Basin in McKinley and Cibola counties, in the northwest part of the state. No mining has been done since 2002, even though the state has second-largest known uranium ore reserves in the US.

=== North Dakota ===
Some lignite coal in southwest North Dakota contains economic quantities of uranium. From 1965 to 1967 Union Carbide operated a mill near Belfield in Stark County to burn uraniferous lignite and extract uranium from the ash. The plant produced about 150 metric tons of U_{3}O_{8} before shutting down.

=== Oklahoma ===
A small amount of uranium ore was mined in the mid-1950s from a surface exposure at Cement in Caddo County. The uranium occurred as carnotite and tyuyamunite in fracture fillings in the Rush Springs Sandstone over the Cement anticline, where the sandstone is bleached. The mined area was 150 feet (46 m) long, 3 to 5 feet (0.9 to 1.5 m) wide, and extended 3 to 5 feet (0.9 to 1.5 m) below ground surface.

=== Oregon ===
Uranium was discovered in Oregon in 1955, 20 miles northwest of Lakeview in Lake County. The White King mine and the Lucky Lass mine shipped uranium from 1955 until 1965. At the White King mine, uranium was mined by both underground and open-pit methods from a low-temperature hydrothermal deposit in Pliocene volcanic rocks, associated with opal, realgar, stibnite, cinnabar, and pyrite. At the Lucky Lass mine ore was mined from an open pit. Uranium occurs in uraninite and autunite in lenses near or in a fault zone in tuffs. The mines fed the Lakeview Mining Company uranium mill.

A minor amount of uranium was mined in 1960 from a deposit at Bear Creek Butte in Crook County. The uranium was present as autunite at the contact between a rhyolite dike and tuffs of the Oligocene-Miocene John Day Formation.

The McDermitt Caldera in Malheur County was the site of intense uranium exploration in the late 1970s. Portland-based Oregon Energy is planning development of the Aurora deposit, near McDermitt. Mining and infrastructure studies are finalised, and metallurgical testwork is expected to conclude in 2024.

=== Pennsylvania ===
The uranium mineral autunite was reported in 1874 near the town of Mauch Chunk (present-day Jim Thorpe) in Carbon County, eastern Pennsylvania. A small amount of test mining was done in 1953 at the Mount Pisgah deposit near Jim Thorpe. The uranium at the Mount Pisgah deposit is primarily in an unidentified black mineral in pods and rolls in the basal conglomerate of the Mauch Chunk Formation (Mississippian). Also present are the secondary uranium and uranium-vanadium minerals carnotite, tyuyamunite, liebigite, uranophane, and betauranophane.

Uranium has been located in only a small portion of the county near the Lehigh River valley and all of the deposits have been named. Mount Pisgah, Mauch Chunk Ridge, Butcher Hollow, and Penn Haven Junction are all within 6 miles of the town. First recognized in 1874, the land that these uranium deposits were found on was partially owned by Lehigh Coal and Navigation Company. The land came to be owned by this company because the founders of the town, Josiah White and Erskine Hazard, were also founders of the company. Mauch Chunk was primarily a company town.

The test mining that was done in Carbon County has raised concerns because of higher chances of polluted water and release of radioactive material. With Jim Thorpe, PA being located right on the Lehigh River, any release of radioactive materials in that area could cause significant environmental damage there and further downstream in the Delaware River. The core drilling test mining occurred in 1953 at the Mauch Chunk Ridge deposit but has seen no further development due to the low uranium content in the rock of about .011 to .013%.

=== South Dakota ===
Uranium was discovered near Edgemont, South Dakota in 1951, quickly followed by mining. The uranium occurs in Cretaceous sandstones of the Inyan Kara group, where it outcrops along the southern edge of the Black Hills in Fall River County, South Dakota. Minerals in unoxidized sandstone are uraninite and coffinite; minerals in oxidized zones include carnotite and tyuyamunite.

An airborne gamma radiation survey flown by the US Atomic Energy Commission in 1954 discovered high radiation readings over the Cave Hills area in Harding County, in the northwest corner of the state. High winds blew the reconnaissance flight off their planned survey route over the Slim Buttes twenty miles southeast of the North Cave Hills. Claims were immediately staked over uranium-bearing lignite beds in the area. The lignite was strip-mined, probably starting that same year, and continuing until the mines closed in 1964.

No uranium is currently mined in South Dakota.

In January 2007 Powertech Uranium Corporation received a state permit to drill boreholes to evaluate its Dewey-Burdock project, in Custer and Fall River counties northwest of Edgemont. Previous work at the property in the early 1980s defined a resource of 10 million pounds (4500 metric tons) of uranium, of which 5 million pounds (2300 metric tons) were estimated recoverable by conventional underground mining. By 2019 Powertech (now a subsidiary of enCore Energy Corp) had increased the measured and indicated resource to 17.1 million pounds of uranium oxide and plans to bring the property into production as an in-situ leaching mine.

A campaign has been underway to halt any effort to mine uranium in the Black Hills because of its effect on Native American and wildlife populations, as well as the effects of mining on the water table and local ranchers. Indigenous leaders and anti-nuclear activists began organizing around this issue in the 1970s and there are still efforts underway to prevent mining on native lands.

=== Texas ===
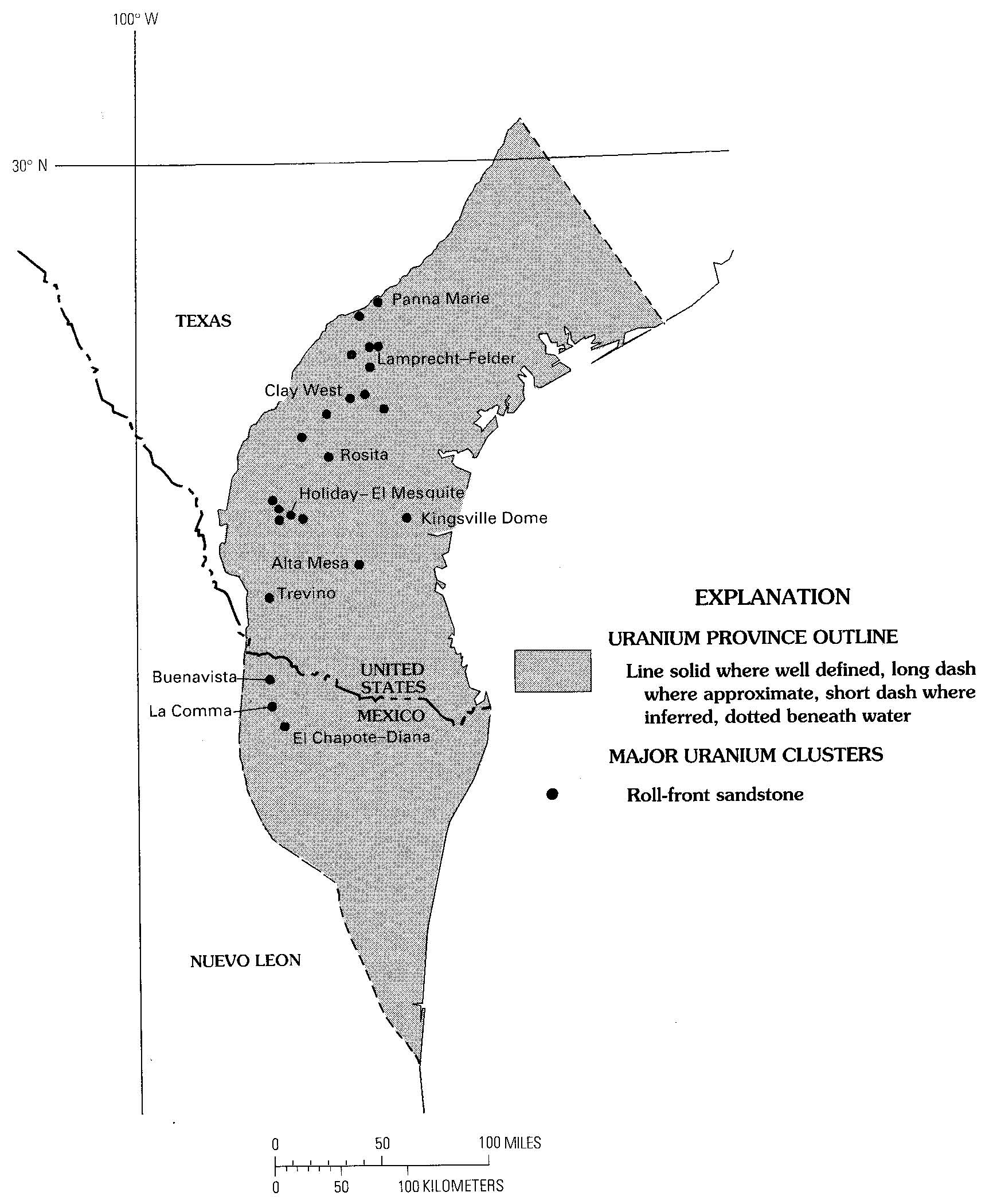
South Texas uranium province – USGS.

The uranium district of south Texas was discovered by accident in 1954 by an airborne gamma radiation survey looking for petroleum deposits. The coastal plain had previously been regarded as highly unfavorable for uranium deposits. The uranium occurs in roll-front type deposits in sandstones of Eocene, Oligocene and Miocene age. The deposits are distributed along about 200 miles (320 km) of coastal plain, from Panna Maria in the north, south into Mexico. Uranium production began in 1958, from open-pit and in situ leach mines.

Uranium production stopped in 1999, but restarted in 2004. By 2006, three mines were active: Kingsville Dome in Kleberg County, the Vasquez mine in Duval County, and the Alta Mesa mine in Brooks County. 2007 production was 1.34 million pounds (607 metric tons) of U_{3}O_{8}. All have since closed.

Uranium Energy Corp. (UEC) began in-situ leach mining at its Palangana deposit (grading .135% U_{3}O_{8}) in Duval County in 2010. Uranium loaded resins from that ion exchange facility are processed into yellowcake at the company's Hobson processing plant. In late 2012, UEC completed the permitting and approval process for the Goliad ISR mining and ion exchange facility in Goliad County.

=== Utah ===
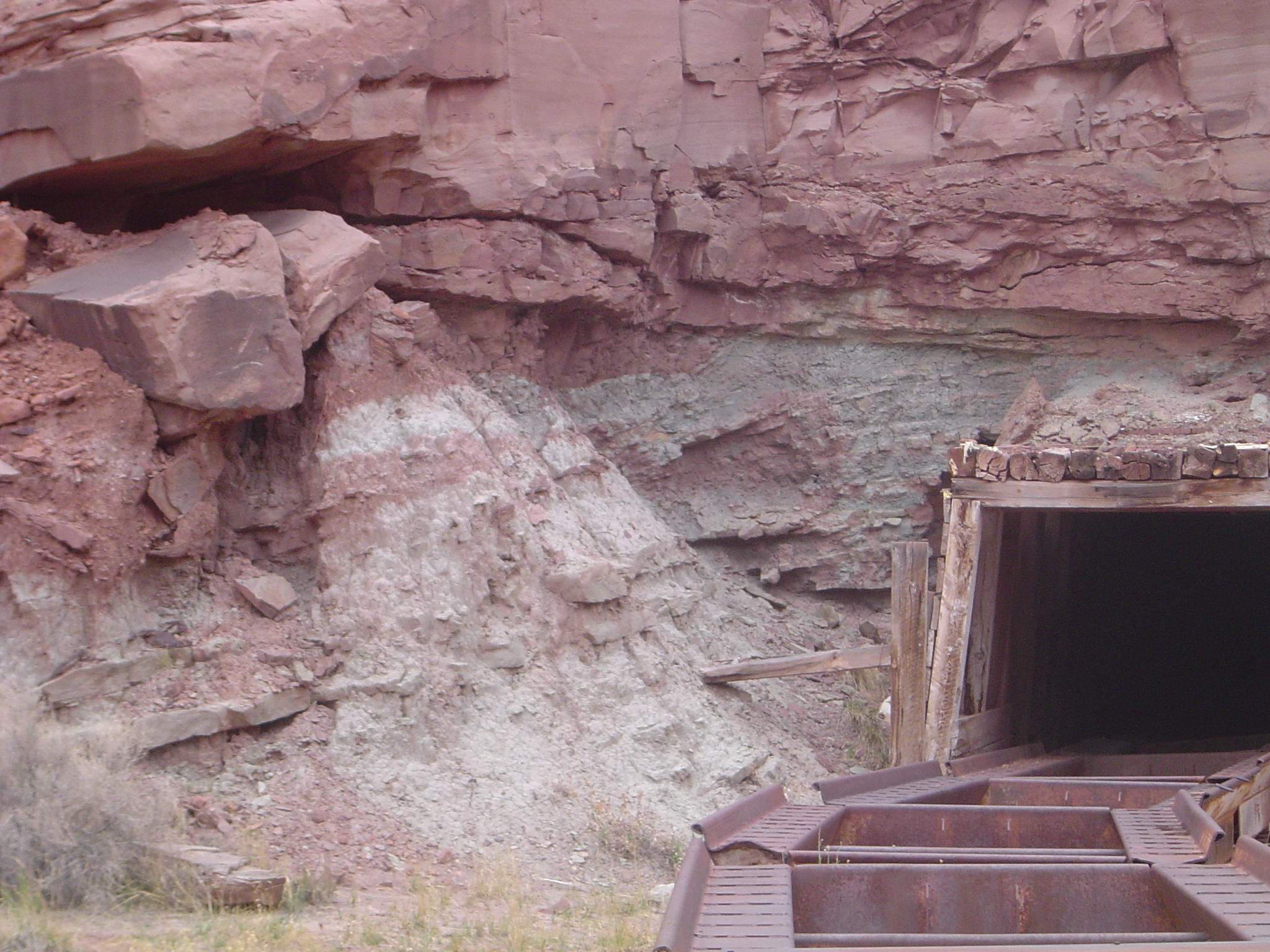
Mi Vida uranium mine near Moab, Utah

Mining of uranium-vanadium ore in southeast Utah goes back to the late 19th century. All of Utah's numerous uranium mines had closed by 1991 because of low prices. In late 2006, Denison Mines reopened the Pandora mine in the La Sal mining district, Utah's first producing uranium mine since 1991. In 2009 White Canyon Uranium opened the Daneros underground mine, 40 miles (64 km) west of Blanding, trucking ore to Denison's White Mesa Mill. In 2011 Denison took over White Canyon Uranium. In 2012 Energy Fuels Inc. acquired Denison's US assets, including the White Mesa Mill. In October 2012 the only operating uranium mines in Utah, the Pandora, Beaver and Daneros mines, were all placed on standby, care and maintenance due to the depressed uranium price.

The White Mesa Mill, 7 miles (11 km) miles south of Blanding, Utah, is the only operating conventional uranium (and vanadium) mill in the United States.

=== Virginia ===
The largest deposit of uranium in the US is in Virginia at Coles Hill; however, the state's generous rainfall and occasional flooding (in contrast with typical American uranium mines in the dry and isolated desert southwest) have led to citizen concern about commercial-scale mining. Lawmakers in the state enacted a de facto ban on uranium mining in 1982. A 2015 federal court case involving the owners of Coles Hill upheld the ban.

Marline Uranium Corp. announced in July 1982 that it had discovered 110 million pounds (50,000 metric tons) of uranium in the Swanson/Coles Hill deposit, on land that it had leased near Chatham in Pittsylvania County. During the 1982 legislative session, the state of Virginia adopted laws to govern exploration for uranium in the Commonwealth. At the same time, the legislature imposed a moratorium on uranium mining in the state until such time that regulations to govern uranium mining could be enacted into law.

In 1981, the Virginia General Assembly approved House Joint Resolution No. 324, which directed the Virginia Coal and Energy Commission to evaluate the effects of uranium development on the Commonwealth and its citizens. The Virginia Coal and Energy Commission is a permanent legislative commission composed of five Senators, eight Delegates, and seven citizens appointed by the Governor.

The Commission completed its evaluation of uranium mining in October 1984 and concluded that the moratorium regarding uranium development could be lifted on the condition that certain specific recommendations derived from its work would be enacted into law.

Union Carbide was the joint venture partner on the project with Marline until early 1984 when it dropped its option on the property due to declining uranium prices. Marline kept the project on care and maintenance until 1990, when it dropped its remaining mineral leases and closed its local exploration office.

The deposits occur as breccia-fill and veins in gneiss bordering the Triassic Danville Basin. Ore minerals are coffinite, uraninite, and uranium-bearing apatite.

In October 2007, Walter Coles, who owns the land over the Coles Hill deposit, announced that he and some other landowners had formed Virginia Uranium Inc. to mine the deposit themselves, if it can be done safely. In November 2007, the state issued an exploration permit to Virginia Uranium, to allow drilling test holes into the deposit. Drilling began in mid-December.

The state-imposed moratorium on uranium mining is still in effect. A bill proposed in the state General Assembly in January 2008 would have created a Virginia Uranium Mining Commission to determine if uranium mining could be done in a manner protective of human health and the environment, and to recommend regulatory controls. The bill passed the Democratic controlled state Senate by a vote of 36–4. However, opponents of uranium mining succeeded in stopping the bill on March 3, 2008, when Rules Committee of the Republican controlled House of Delegates delayed consideration of the bill until 2009.

In November 2008, the Virginia Coal and Energy Commission voted unanimously to once again create a subcommittee to study the issue of uranium mining. In May 2009 the subcommittee approved a study of potential uranium mining and its safety and pollution issues. The study is expected to take about 18 months to complete.

In February 2010, the Commonwealth of Virginia contracted the National Research Council and Virginia Polytechnic Institute to oversee a National Research Council study of potential environmental and economic effects of uranium mining in Virginia. The National Research Council study, funded indirectly by a $1.4 million grant from Virginia Uranium to the Commonwealth, resulted in a report released in December 2011.

The report identified a range of health and environmental issues and related risks that could result from uranium mining in the Commonwealth of Virginia. The report found that although there are internationally accepted best practices to mitigate some risks, Virginia faces "steep hurdles" if it is to undertake uranium mining and processing within a regulatory setting that appropriately protects workers, the public, and the environment.

Uranium mining and processing carries with it a range of potential health risks to the people who work in or live near uranium mining and processing facilities. Some of these health risks apply to any type of hard rock mining or other large-scale industrial activity, but others are linked to exposure to radioactive materials. In addition, uranium mining has the potential to impact water, soil, and air quality, with the degree of impact depending on site-specific conditions, how early a contaminant release is detected by monitoring systems, and the effectiveness of mitigation steps.

Some of the worker and public health risks could be mitigated or better controlled through modern internationally accepted best practices, the report says. In addition, if uranium mining, processing, and reclamation were designed, constructed, operated, and monitored according to best practices, near-to-moderate-term environmental effects should be substantially reduced, the report found.

However, the report noted that Virginia's high water table and heavy rainfall differed from other parts of the United States—typically dry, Western states—where uranium mining has taken place. Consequently, federal agencies have little experience developing and applying laws and regulations in locations with abundant rainfall and groundwater, such as Virginia. Because of Virginia's moratorium on uranium mining, it has not been necessary for the Commonwealth's agencies to develop a regulatory program that is applicable to uranium mining, processing, and reclamation.

The report also noted the long-term environmental risks of uranium tailings, the solid waste left after processing. Tailings disposal sites represent potential sources of contamination for thousands of years. While it is likely that tailings impoundment sites would be safe for at least 200 years if designed and built according to modern best practices, the long-term risks of radioactive contaminant release are unknown.

The report's authoring committee was not asked to recommend whether uranium mining should be permitted, or to consider the potential benefits to the state were uranium mining to be pursued. It also was not asked to compare the relative risks of uranium mining to the mining of other fuels such as coal.

In October 2015, it went before a federal judge whether the 33-year-old ban on large-scale uranium mining in Virginia would be lifted. In June 2019, the Supreme Court of the United States ruled that, in the absence of federal law establishing otherwise, "...[states retain] authority over the regulation of mining activities on private lands within their borders,” and therefore the state ban on uranium mining remains in place.

=== Washington ===
Uranium was discovered at the Midnite Mine deposit on the Spokane Indian Reservation, Stevens County, north-east Washington in 1954. The deposit was mined from an open pit 1956–1962 and 1969–1982. Production through 1975 was 8 million pounds (3,600 metric tons) of U_{3}O_{8}. The uranium is contained in autunite, uraninite, and coffinite, with gangue minerals pyrite and marcasite. The ore occurs as disseminations, replacements, and stockworks in Precambrian metamorphic rocks of the Togo formation, in a roof pendant in Cretaceous porphyritic quartz monzonite.

Western Nuclear discovered the Spokane Mountain uranium deposit in 1975, two miles (3.2 km) northeast of the Midnite Mine, and in a similar geologic setting.

Other major Washington state uranium mines included the Sherwood mine, located five miles south of the Midnite mine, and the Daybreak mine, located six miles southeast of Elk, Washington. The Daybreak mine is recognized as the source of the finest museum-quality specimens of autunite and meta-autunite yet found. Sherwood had a co-located uranium mill, while Midnite and Daybreak ores were processed at the Dawn uranium mill, at Ford, Washington.

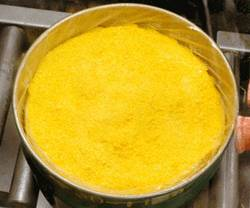
A drum of yellowcake

=== Wyoming ===
Wyoming once had many operating uranium mines, and once had the largest known uranium ore reserves of any state in the U.S. The Wyoming uranium mining industry was hard-hit in the 1980s by the drop in the price of uranium. The uranium-mining boom town of Jeffrey City lost 95% of its population in three years. By 2020, the only active uranium mine in Wyoming was the Smith Ranch-Highland in-situ leaching operation in the Powder River Basin, owned by Cameco. The mine has produced 23 million pounds of uranium since it opened in 1975. Wellfield development was suspended during 2016. The Measured and Indicated Resource is 24.9 million pounds of U_{3}O_{8} at a grade of 0.06%.

== Health and environmental issues ==
The radiation hazards of uranium mining and milling were not appreciated in the early years, resulting in workers being exposed to high levels of radiation. Inhalation of radon gas caused sharp increases in lung cancers among underground uranium miners employed in the 1940s and 1950s. Risks related to the inhalation of radon gas and the deposition of radon daughter products in the lung were discussed publicly as early as 1951 in American newspapers. The hazard was considered to be generally greater in deeper underground workings, where providing adequate ventilation and suppressing dust was more difficult. Concerns for American miners' health were based on the observation of elevated lung cancer incidence among miners who mine uranium-bearing ore underground in Czechoslovakia and Germany.

Conventional uranium ore treatment mills create radioactive waste in the form of tailings, which contain uranium, radium, and polonium. Consequently, uranium mining results in "the unavoidable radioactive contamination of the environment by solid, liquid and gaseous wastes".

In the 1940s and 1950s, uranium mill tailings were released with impunity into water sources, and the radium leached from these tailings contaminated thousands of miles of the Colorado River system. Between 1966 and 1971, thousands of homes and commercial buildings in the Colorado Plateau region were "found to contain anomalously high concentrations of radon, after being built on uranium tailings taken from piles under the authority of the Atomic Energy Commission".

In 1950, the US Public Health service began a comprehensive study of uranium miners, leading to the first publication of a statistical correlation between cancer and uranium mining, released in 1962. The federal government eventually regulated the standard amount of radon in mines, setting the level at 0.3 WL on January 1, 1969.

Out of 50 present and former uranium milling sites in 12 states, 24 have been abandoned, and are the responsibility of the US Department of Energy. Accidental releases from uranium mills include the 1979 Church Rock uranium mill spill in New Mexico, called the largest accident of nuclear-related waste in US history, and the 1986 Sequoyah Corporation Fuels Release in Oklahoma.

In 1990, Congress passed the Radiation Exposure Compensation Act (RECA), granting reparations for those affected by mining, with amendments passed in 2000 to address criticisms with the original act.

The Navajo people have had a long history of dealing with the physical effects and environmental burden from uranium mining on their lands. This not only includes those who have worked in the mines but those who have never set foot in one and have to deal with the radioactivity in the surrounding areas. This has led to higher developments of different types of cancer and respiratory and kidney conditions. While the Lukachukai Mountain site was still functioning, there were slow and fast forms of radiation exposure. Because uranium and its health concerns were unknown to the Navajo people at the time, workers would come home covered in dust from the mines that had traces of uranium and other radioactive materials. This would cause more sudden forms of radiation exposure, but the contamination of land and water sources would happen slowly over time and leech into Navajo households. Reporter Noel Lyn Smith has earned her master’s degree in investigative journalism and is focusing on all aspects of the Navajo Nation with specific interest in the government, who has gotten involved and declared the Lukachukai Mountains Mining District a superfund site which means that a door has been opened for federal funding to help clean up the “more than 800,000 cubic yards of mine waste in piles scattered throughout the site.”

=== Uranium mining, milling and the American Southwest ===
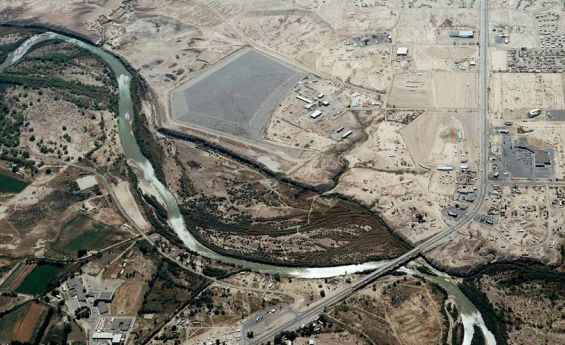
Shiprock, New Mexico uranium mill aerial photo

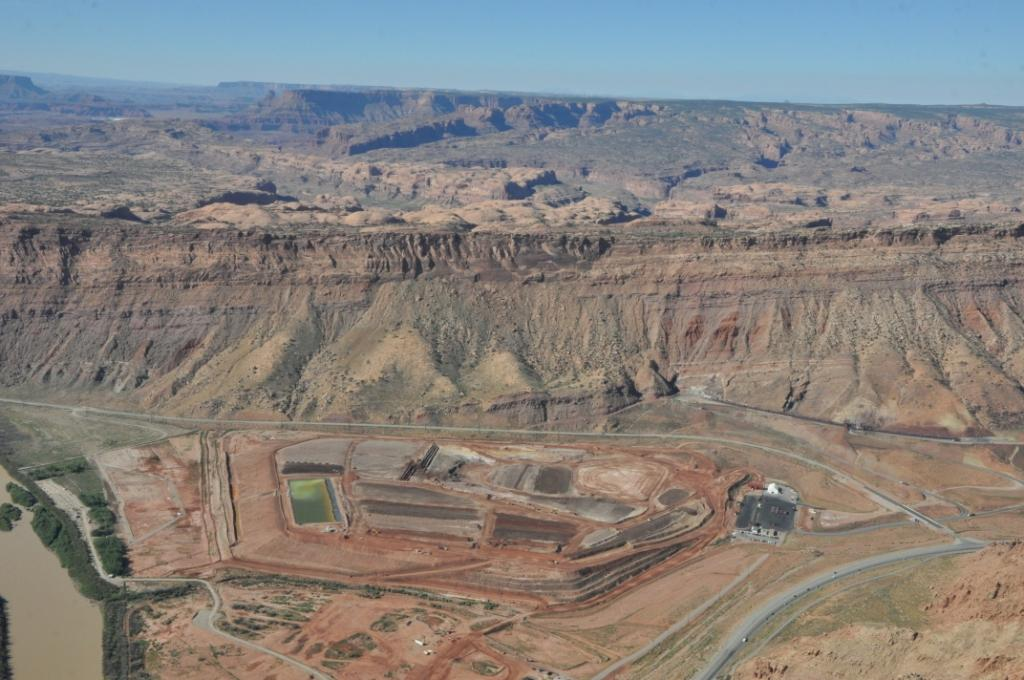
Moab uranium mill tailings pile

In the post-war period mine workers in the Four Corners area were exposed to and brought home large amounts of radiation in the form of dust on their clothing and skin. Epidemiologic studies of the families of these workers have shown increased incidents of radiation-induced cancers, miscarriages, cleft palates and other birth defects. The extent of these genetic effects on indigenous populations and the extent of DNA damage remains to be resolved.

All over the American Southwest, Uranium mines are seeing a revival. There are multiple plans to reopen closed mines in Texas, Utah, Wyoming, and Arizona. All the while the United States are still dealing with the same environmental injustices that these mining practices have caused. After the Fukushima disaster, many uranium mines closed because uranium prices dropped so much it wasn’t economically viable to keep mining. Following the United Nations Climate Conference COP28 in Dubai in 2023, climate change and spiking uranium prices have increased interest in nuclear power. Critics, however, have concerns about potential environmental damages in the future along with the environmental injustices that have already taken place in indigenous communities.

Native tribes have already started a push to shut down new mining operation plans and are highlighting the need for approval of those in the community unlike previous instances where the current system of colonialism has been the primary way of thinking. One of these previous instances has been the Church Rock Mine in New Mexico, owned by United Nuclear Corporation. The dam that was holding 94 million gallons of radioactive waste broke, made its way onto Navajo lands, and now contaminates the land that their animals graze on to this day.

Some believe that as America heads towards a green energy future, the increase in critical mineral extraction cannot lead towards a future of green colonialism. The thought being that Tribal Nations must have a more meaningful stake in the future of critical mineral mining if the United States wants to decrease dependency on foreign nations for critical minerals. It is also thought that the Government must develop a policy that ensures we don’t repeat history. Colonialism won’t cut it anymore. Mark Trahant, a former editor for Indian Country Today, says “This time it’s different, perhaps, because tribal nations can either be essential producers or legal obstacles and irritants.”

=== Uranium mining, milling and the Navajo people ===
After the end of World War II, large uranium deposits were found on and near the Navajo Reservation in the Southwest, and private companies hired many Navajo employees to work the mines. Disregarding the known health risks imposed by exposure to uranium, the private companies and the United States Atomic Energy Commission failed to inform the Navajo workers about the dangers and to regulate the mining to minimize contamination. As more data was collected, they were slow to take appropriate action for the workers.

Studies provided data to show that the Navajo mine workers and numerous families on the reservation have suffered high rates of disease from environmental contamination, but for decades, industry and the government failed to regulate or improve conditions, or inform workers of the dangers. As high rates of illness began to occur, workers were often unsuccessful in court cases seeking compensation, and the states at first did not officially recognize radon illness.

Lands that have been subject to permanent environmental damages for the collective good are referred to as “national sacrifice zones.” These zones have been commonly caused by polluting industries such as uranium mining sites and United States Military bases. Polluting industries like these leave hazardous chemicals in their wake for the surrounding residents and threaten the economics, cultures and welfare of the tribes living in or near these sacrifice zones. Environmental Justice Scholar Kyle Keeler states that sacrifice zones are “for the betterment of colonial society” Throughout the 20th century, the Navajo nation has been subject to these sacrifice zones due to exploitation from the country’s nuclear goals. As Scholar Traci Brynne Voyles has mentioned in her book, “Diné land hosts upward of 2,000 now-abandoned uranium mines, mills, and tailings piles, in which over 3,000 Navajo miners wrenched and blasted raw uranium ore from the ground and then processed it into yellowcake.”

“Wastelanding” is a term that was coined by Traci Brynne Voyles in her book, and she describes it as a place “from which resources are increasingly extracted and where (often toxic) waste is increasingly dumped.” It is used to describe the environmental and social impacts of uranium mining. The people that live on these wastelands are subject to disproportionate amounts of exposure to environmental harms, like groundwater contamination and the effects from PCBs being in their system. The Manhattan project is one of the main reasons the Navajo reservation has so many abandoned mines on it today. Being located in Los Alamos, the United States government was in very close proximity to the uranium mines found on Navajo lands. They took advantage of this and started the rush towards a nuclear weapons future. Princeton University’s Nuclear Program has released an article that talks about how “Tribal nations were displaced from their homelands for the construction of these facilities and were often denied access to their homelands both throughout the project and to the present day.”

In 1990 the US Congress passed the Radiation Exposure Compensation Act, to settle such cases and provide needed compensation. In 2008 the US Congress authorized a five-year, multi-agency cleanup of uranium contamination on the Navajo Nation reservation; identification and treatment of contaminated water and structures has been the first priority. Certain water sources have been closed, and numerous contaminated buildings have been taken down. By the summer of 2011, EPA had nearly completed the first major project of removal of 20,000 cubic yards of contaminated earth from the Skyline Mine area.

Uranium mining has disturbed the balance in Navajo culture. They must stay and fight for their land but are dealing with so many adverse health and environmental effects because of it. The Holy People in Navajo culture have set the boundaries of their land, and the earth people must do whatever they can to try to heal and protect that land. Trying to seek justice for the effects of uranium mining have been continuous, with groups like Eastern Navajo Diné Against Uranium Mining playing a critical role. ENDAUM was created in 1994 to combat plans to open uranium mines that were presented by HydroResources Inc. They have been fighting the same overall cause for three decades now. Workers had not been informed of the dangers uranium mining would inflict on their land. This is only a little part of a much larger issue, with economic issues being a top priority in our country and shutting out the rights and well-being of indigenous people.

== See also ==
- Anti-nuclear movement in the United States
- Botanical prospecting for uranium
- List of uranium projects
- Nuclear labor issues
- Nuclear power in the United States
- The Return of Navajo Boy, a 2000 documentary film about Navajo struggling with the legacy of uranium mining on their lands
- Uranium Mill Tailings Radiation Control Act
- Virginia Uranium, Inc. v. Warren
