= Super Millionaire =

Super Millionaire may refer to:

- Who Wants to Be a Super Millionaire, an American TV quiz game show, a spin-off of the American version of Who Wants to Be a Millionaire?, also known as "Super Millionaire"
- Super Millionaire, a Japanese TV quiz game show, a spin-off of Quiz $ Millionaire
- Super Millionaire (富貴超人), a 1991 Hong Kong TV drama; see Johnny Ngan

== See also ==
- Multi-Millionaire (disambiguation)
- millionaire (disambiguation)
