= Trichloroethane =

Trichloroethane (C_{2}H_{3}Cl_{3}) may refer to either of two isomeric chemical compounds:

- 1,1,1-Trichloroethane (methyl chloroform, CCl_{3}CH_{3})
- 1,1,2-Trichloroethane (vinyl trichloride, CHCl_{2}CH_{2}Cl)
