= The Absolutely True Diary of a Part-Time Indian =

2007 novel by Sherman Alexie

- First edition cover
- Author: Sherman Alexie
- Illustrator: Ellen Forney
- Cover artist: Kirk Benshoff
- Language: English
- Genre: Young adult fiction
- Publisher: Little, Brown and Company
- Publication date: September 12, 2007
- Publication place: Canada
- Media type: Print (hardback and paperback)
- Pages: 230
- ISBN: 978-0-316-01368-0
- OCLC: 154698238
- LC Class: PZ7.A382 Ab 2007

The Absolutely True Diary of a Part-Time Indian is a first-person narrative novel by Sherman Alexie, from the perspective of a Native American teenager, Arnold Spirit Jr., also known as "Junior," a 14-year-old promising cartoonist. The book is about Junior's life on the Spokane Indian Reservation and his decision to go to a nearly all-white public high school away from the reservation. The graphic novel includes 65 comic illustrations that help further the plot.

Although critically acclaimed, The Absolutely True Diary has also been the subject of controversy and has consistently appeared on the annual list of frequently challenged books since 2008, becoming the most frequently challenged book from 2010 to 2019. Controversy stems from how the novel describes alcohol, poverty, bullying, violence, sexuality and bulimia. As a result, a small collective of schools have challenged it, and some schools have blocked the book from distribution in school libraries or inclusion in the curricula.

== Plot ==
The book follows fourteen-year-old Arnold Spirit Jr., also known as "Junior," living with his family on the Spokane Indian Reservation near Wellpinit, Washington. The book is an epistolary and chronicles Junior's life from the start of the school year to the beginning of summer. It includes both Junior's written record of his life and his cartoon drawings, some of them comically commenting on his situations, and others more seriously depicting important people in his life.

Born with hydrocephalus, Junior is small for his age and has seizures, poor eyesight, stuttering, and a lisp, making him a frequent bullying target for others on the reservation. Junior's only friend is Rowdy, who is abused at home. Despite his reputation as a bully on the reservation, Rowdy often stands up for Junior and they bond over their shared love of comics. Junior's family is extremely poor and has limited access to opportunities; for example, Junior's father is forced to put down the family dog, Oscar, by shooting him as they cannot afford to see a veterinarian after Oscar gets heat stroke.

On the first day of school, Junior discovers his mother's name written in his textbook. Angered and saddened that the reservation is so poor it cannot afford new textbooks, Junior violently throws the book, inadvertently hitting his teacher, Mr. P, and breaking his nose. While visiting Junior at home, Mr. P convinces him to transfer to another high school, sensing a degree of precociousness in him. Junior elects to attend Reardan, a school in a much wealthier neighborhood with no other Indian students. Despite his family's financial situation, they do what they can to make it possible for him to attend. Rowdy, however, is upset by Junior's decision to transfer, and they gradually begin to cease contact.

Junior develops a crush on popular girl Penelope and befriends straight-A student Gordy. His interactions with the white students give him more perspective on both white culture and his own, and he finds himself torn between pressures to fit in at Reardan and his sense of loyalty to his Indian heritage. He realizes how much stronger his family ties are than those of his white classmates, noticing that many of the white fathers never attend school events. Junior also realizes that the white students have different rules than those he grew up with, evident when he reacts to an insult from the school's star athlete, Roger, by punching him in the face, as would be expected of him on the reservation. To his surprise, Roger never seeks revenge, and in fact only ends up respecting Junior more after the incident. Junior also grows closer to Penelope, which greatly increases his popularity as the 'almost boyfriend' of the most popular girl in the school.

Roger suggests that Junior try out for the basketball team. To Junior's surprise, he makes the varsity team, which pits him against his former school, Wellpinit, and Rowdy, who is Wellpinit's star freshman. When Junior enters the court for his first match, his former schoolmates boo and insult him. Junior suffers some injuries from the game, namely from Rowdy knocking him unconscious, but his coach commends his commitment to the team.

Later on, Junior's grandmother is hit and killed by a drunk driver. After her funeral, a family friend, Eugene, is shot in the face by his friend Bobby while both are intoxicated and fighting over the last sip of alcohol. Later, Reardan wins their second match against Wellpinit. Junior feels triumphant until he sees the look of defeat on the Wellpinit players' faces and remembers the lack of hope he had for his future while growing up on the reservation. Ashamed, he runs to the locker room, vomits, and breaks down sobbing. Later, Junior receives news that his sister and her husband were killed in a fire at their trailer.

The tragedies that afflict Junior and his family, though forcing him to question his future and ponder the darker aspects of reservation culture, reaffirm his love for his family and friends, and he eventually learns to identify as both Indian and American. Rowdy later realizes that Junior is the only nomad on the reservation, which makes him more of a "traditional" Indian than anyone else there. In the end, Junior and Rowdy reconcile while playing basketball and resolve to remain friends no matter where the future takes them.

== Background ==
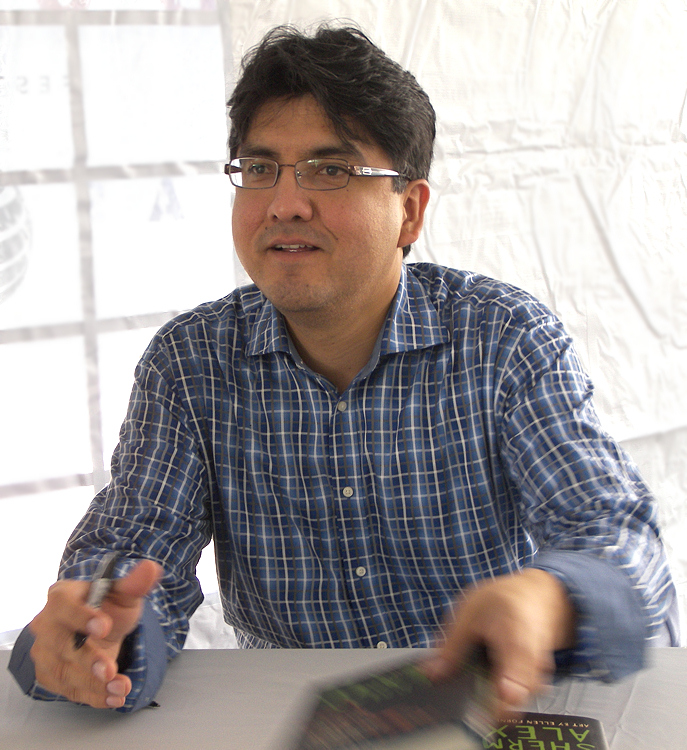
Author, Sherman Alexie, at the Texas Book Festival in 2008

The Absolutely True Diary of a Part-Time Indian is semi-autobiographical. The novel started as a section of Sherman Alexie's family memoir, but after the persistence of a young adult editor, he decided to use it as a basis for his first young adult novel. Sherman Alexie commented, "If I were to guess at the percentage, it would be about seventy-eight percent true." Like Arnold, Sherman Alexie grew up on the Spokane Reservation in Wellpinit with an alcoholic father. He was also born with hydrocephalus, but Alexie did not have any speech impediments. Alexie was also teased for his government-issued, horn-rimmed glasses and nicknamed "The Globe" by fellow students because of his giant head. Another similarity between Alexie and his character Arnold is that Alexie also left the reservation to attend high school at Reardan High, but Alexie chose to go to Reardan to achieve the required credits he needed to go to college. Alexie became the star player of Reardan's basketball team and was the only Indian on the team besides the school's team mascot. The scene where Arnold finds that he is using the same textbook his mother did thirty years before him is drawn from Alexie's own experiences. The only difference between Alexie's life and the novel is that Alexie threw the book against the wall out of anger, and did not hit anyone as Junior did.

In his own writing, Alexie unapologetically describes himself as "kind of mixed up, kind of odd, not traditional. I'm a rez kid who's gone urban, and that's what I write about. I have never pretended to be otherwise." "A smart Indian is a dangerous person," Alexie states in a personal essay, "[a smart Indian is] widely feared and ridiculed by Indians and non-Indians alike." Junior encapsulates this type of experience when he receives strong censure both from his tribal community and from his peers and teachers at his new school, Reardan. In the personal story, Alexie's continued explanation of his own experience is reflected in Junior's. Alexie recalls, "I fought with my classmates on a daily basis. They wanted me to stay quiet when the non-Indian teacher asked for answers....[W]e were Indian children who were expected to be stupid. ...[W]e were expected to fail in the non-Indian world." Through Junior's success at Reardan and his realizations about life on the reservation, Alexie represents a possibility for the success of Native American children—by defeating the expectation that he is doomed to fail, Junior defeated what he thought he couldn't. Alexie's reflections again demonstrate that Junior's experiences are semi-autobiographical.

== Characters ==
Arnold Spirit Jr. AKA Junior
Nicknamed Junior, Arnold is a fourteen-year-old boy who lives on the Spokane Indian Reservation. He enjoys playing basketball and drawing cartoons in his free time. Junior and his family, along with the others on the reservation, feel the daily effects of poverty and financial shortcomings—there is often not enough food to eat in their home or enough money to fill the gas tank in the car, forcing him to hitchhike to school or not go at all. He is incredibly smart; he transfers from the school on the reservation to Reardan, where almost all the students are white.
Agnes (Adams) Spirit (Junior's Mother)
A Spokane Indian, Agnes has lived on the reservation her entire life. She is a bad liar, likes to read books, and is considered to be very smart by her children. She is an ex-alcoholic and is seen as eccentric by Junior: "She's a human tape recorder," Junior explains, "Really, my mom can read the newspaper in fifteen minutes and tell me baseball scores, the location of every war, the latest guy to win the lottery, and the high temperature in Des Moines, Iowa." (Note: Alexie, p. 13.)
Arnold Spirit (Junior's Father)
An alcoholic, but very supportive. Even though he sometimes disappears, he tries to take care of his family and he often drives Junior to Reardan. He plays the piano, the guitar, and the saxophone. He could have been a jazz musician, given more time and money.
Coach
The coach of the basketball team at Reardan High School. Unlike the teachers who are apprehensive of Junior's attendance at Reardan, the coach pays no attention to Junior's race. He is supportive of Junior both on and off the court. (Note: Alexie, p. 148.) The coach becomes a father figure for Junior in many ways, but also becomes an exemplary friend, helping Junior through difficult times dealing with playing against his home reservation. The novel never gives a name to him, as he is always referred to as coach.
Dawn
When Arnold Spirit was twelve years old, he loved this girl. She was his first crush. He thought about Dawn when he said to Rowdy that he loved Penelope.
Eugene
The best friend of Junior's father. "Eugene was a nice guy, and like an uncle to me, but he was drunk all the time," (Note: Alexie, p. 70.) Junior reveals. He becomes an Emergency Medical Technician (EMT) for the tribal ambulance service, and, for a brief time, drives a 1946 Indian Chief Roadmaster. Eugene dies after his close friend Bobby shoots him in the face during a dispute over alcohol. Bobby hangs himself in jail.
Gordy
Gordy is a student who attends Reardan, wears glasses, and does everything in the name of science. Gordy always speaks in a sophisticated and proper manner throughout the novel. He is one of the smartest students at the school and he eventually becomes Junior's first real friend at Reardan. Gordy also helps Junior with schoolwork and encourages his enjoyment of reading books.
Grandmother Spirit
Junior's Grandma. She is Junior's source of advice and support until she dies after being hit by a drunk driver while walking on the side of the road on her way home after a powwow. Her dying words were "Forgive him," which meant that she wanted her family to forgive the drunk driver, Gerald, for hitting and killing her. Ironically, she never had a drink in her life. She was also extremely tolerant and loving of all people. Junior's grandma is his favorite person in the world. "My grandmother's last act on earth was a call for forgiveness, love, and tolerance," Junior recalls on page 157. (Note: Alexie, p. 157.)
Mary
Junior's sister. Mary has long hair and is nicknamed "Mary Runs Away." She likes to write romance stories and is considered by Junior to be "beautiful and strong and funny." She was smart, but did not have the skills to get a job. (Note: Alexie, p. 28.) After high school, she did not go to college or get a job; instead, she moved to Montana with her new husband she met at the reservation casino. Mary and her new husband die of a fire in their trailer home after a partygoer forgot about a boiling pot of soup. A curtain drifted onto the hot plate and the trailer was quickly engulfed. Junior was told that Mary never woke up because she was too drunk.
Melinda
Melinda works in the office of Reardan High School. She is 50 years old.
Mr. P
Junior's white geometry teacher at Wellpinit High School. He mentored Mary, Junior's older sister, and wants to help Junior leave the reservation. Mr. P regrets the way he treated his students when he was younger. He had been taught to beat the Indian out of the children. He is short and bald, and incredibly absent-minded. He often forgets to come to school, but "he doesn't expect much of [his students]." (Note: Alexie, p. 32.) A major turning point in Diary's plot occurs when Junior throws his math book at Mr. P after a realization about the reservation's poverty.
Penelope
Junior's crush and good friend from Reardan High. She has blonde hair and Junior thinks that she is very attractive. She enjoys helping others, is bulimic, and has a racist father named Earl. She is popular and plays on the Reardan volleyball team. She is obsessed with leaving the small town behind and traveling the world. She initially decides to be close with Junior, fed up with the conformity of the town; but closer to the end of the novel, she does become Junior's girlfriend.
Roger
Roger is a jock at Reardan High School. Upon meeting Junior, Roger uses racial slurs to demean him, and eventually it gets so racist that Junior retaliates by punching him in the face. Contrary to Junior's expectations, Roger then begins to respect Junior, and the two gradually become friends. Furthermore, Roger obtains a role as a kind of advisor and protector of Junior, occasionally helping him monetarily and other times with advice.
Rowdy
Rowdy is Junior's best friend. He is "long and lean & strong like a snake." (Note: Alexie, p. 15.) Throughout the novel, Rowdy's father abuses him, which leads to his bully-like behavior. He likes reading comics, such as Archie. The comics help him escape the troubles of the real world. Junior and Rowdy have been the best of friends since they were little, and Rowdy has often taken on the role of Junior's protector. However, as Junior leaves the reservation school, Rowdy feels betrayed by his best friend and turns into Junior's "arch nemesis" during the novel. Even though Rowdy develops a passionate hatred for Junior through the betrayal he felt, they are able to eventually overcome their situation and become friends again by the end of the novel.
Ted
A rich, white collector of Native art who came to Grandmother Spirit's funeral to give back a powwow dancing outfit. Junior's mother tells him it was not an outfit from the Spokane Indians, and he drives away, giving everyone at the funeral a good laugh.

== Reception ==
=== Reviews ===
Bruce Barcott of The New York Times said in a 2007 review, "For 15 years now, Sherman Alexie has explored the struggle to survive between the grinding plates of the Indian and white worlds. He's done it through various characters and genres, but The Absolutely True Diary of a Part-Time Indian may be his best work yet. Working in the voice of a 14-year-old forces Alexie to strip everything down to action and emotion, so that reading becomes more like listening to your smart, funny best friend recount his day while waiting after school for a ride home."

The New York Times opined that this was Alexie's "first foray into the young adult genre, and it took him only one book to master it." The San Francisco Chronicle praised it as "[a] great book full of pain, but luckily, the pain is spiked with joy and humor."

Reviewers also commented on Alexie's treatment of difficult issues. Delia Santos, a publisher for the civilrights.org page, noted, "Alexie fuses words and images to depict the difficult journey many Native Americans face. ... Although Junior is a young adult, he must face the reality of living in utter poverty, contend with the discrimination of those outside of the reservation, cope with a community and a family ravaged and often killed by alcoholism, break cultural barriers at an all-White high school, and maintain the perseverance needed to hope and work for a better future." Andrew Fersch, a publisher for Vail Daily, commented, "most folks block out most of their teenage memory, [while] Alexie embraced it with humor."

In another review published in November 2016 by Dakota Student website, author Breanna Roen says that she has never seen the way that this book, The Absolutely True Diary of a Part-Time Indian, conveys so much happiness, love, and grief. Alexie's work in this novel can't be compared to other Native American books; it is "a whole different ball game," Roen asserts. The review continues to state that the theme regarding identity, home, race, poverty, tradition, friendship, hope and success is seen throughout the entire book, leaving the readers on the edge of their seats and wanting more. Roen says that she could hardly put the book down and is avidly looking for something similar.

In the review, "A Brave Life: The Real Struggles of a Native American Boy make an Uplifting Story" published in The Guardian, author Diane Samuels says that Alexie's book has a "combination of drawings, pithy turns of phrase, candor, tragedy, despair and hope ... [that] makes this more than an entertaining read, more than an engaging story about a North American Indian kid who makes it out of a poor, dead-end background without losing his connection with who he is and where he's from." In some areas, Samuels criticizes Alexie's stylistic reliance on the cartoons. However, she continues to say that for the most part, Sherman Alexie has a talent for capturing the details and overview in a well-developed and snappy way. Samuels finishes her review by stating that: "Opening this book is like meeting a friend you'd never make in your actual life and being given a piece of his world, inner and outer. It's humane, authentic and, most of all, it speaks."

In the review "Using The Absolutely True Diary of a Part-Time Indian to Teach About Racial Formation," Miami University professor Kevin Talbert says that Alexie chose to narrate the story through the eyes of fourteen-year-old Junior to transport his readers into "uncomfortable or incongruent spaces." He continues to say that the novel's writing allows for topics about class and racial struggles to be intertwined with more common adolescent struggles like sexual desires, controlling hormones, and managing relationships with friends and family. Furthermore, Talbert believes that, unlike other Young Adult novels, this book captures issues of race and class in a way that reaches a wider audience. The article also states that Junior's narration in the novel sends a message to society, "that adolescents have important things to say, that being fourteen years old matters."

=== Critical interpretation ===
Dr. Bryan Ripley Crandall, director of the Connecticut Writing Project at Fairfield University, posits in his critical essay "Adding a Disability Perspective When Reading Adolescent Literature: Sherman Alexie's The Absolutely True Diary of a Part-Time Indian" that the book presents a progressive view of disability. Arnold has what he calls "water on the brain," which would correctly be referred to as hydrocephalus. Crandall points out that Arnold is never held back by his disability, but in fact laughs at himself: "With my big feet and pencil body, I looked like a capital L walking down the road." According to Crandall, the illustrations by Ellen Forney, which are meant to be the cartoons that Arnold draws, represent a new way for the disabled narrator to communicate with the readers: they "initiate further interpretations and conversations about how students perceive others who are not like them, especially individuals with disabilities." Arnold's hydrocephaly doesn't prevent him from becoming a basketball star at his new school. His disability fades as a plot device as the book progresses.

David Goldstein, in his paper "Sacred Hoop Dreams: Basketball in the Work of Sherman Alexie," analyses the importance of basketball in the novel. He suggests that it represents "the tensions between traditional lifeways and contemporary social realities." According to Goldstein, Junior/Arnold sees losing at basketball as "losing at life." The Reardan kids are eternal winners because of their victories on the court: "Those kids were magnificent." Goldstein notes how basketball is also a sport of poverty in America — "it costs virtually nothing to play, and so is appropriate for the reservation."

Nerida Weyland's article, "Representations of Happiness in Comedic Young Adult Fiction: Happy Are the Wretched" describes how Junior/Arnold is an example of the complex, not-innocent child often presented in modern young adult literature. As detailed in Alyson Miller's "Unsuited to Age Group: The Scandals of Children's Literature," society has created an "innocence of the idealized child"; Alexie's protagonist is the opposite of this figure.

According to Weyland, Alexie doesn't play by the rules – the use of humor in the book is directed at established "power hierarchies, dominant social ideologies or topics deemed taboo." Weyland suggests that the outsized effect of this feature of the book is revealed in the controversy its publication caused, as it was banned and challenged in schools all over the country. Weyland states that Alexie's book with Forney's black-comedy illustrations explore themes of "racial tension, domestic violence, and social injustice" in a never-before-done way. As an example, Alexie uses the anecdote of the killing of Junior's dog, Oscar, to expand on the idea of social mobility, or lack thereof – Junior states that he understood why the dog had to be killed rather than taken to the vet, because his parents were poor and they "came from poor people who came from poor people who came from poor people, all the way back to the very first poor people." Weyland notes how readers are likely to be uncomfortable with Junior/Arnold/Alexie making light of topics of such importance (racism, poverty, alcoholism) through the use of dark comedy.

Jan Johnson, clinical assistant professor of American Indian and African American Literatures at the University of Idaho, utilizes Alexie's novel to explore the idea of marginalization and oppression in Native American communities in her article, "Healing The Soul Wound". Johnson identifies the "soul wound," the deep-seated trauma Native Americans have endured since colonization and continue to struggle with. This term explains how the consistent depiction of Native American people as suffering and helpless has become ingrained into their identity. Johnson writes, "Alexie feels that—as a result of this grim history—suffering and trauma are fundamental to the experience of being Native American. Ceaseless suffering attains an epistemological status." Johnson uses the novel to illustrate her thoughts about the future of the Native American culture. The Spokane Indians, and tribes like them, face the trauma of searching for an identity in a world that attempts to envelop one's culture. Johnson argues that Alexie uses Diary to represent the potential for healing the traumas that Native American tribes have faced throughout history.

In Sherman Alexie, A Collection of Critical Essays, critics Jeff Burglund and Jan Roush interpret Jan Johnson's definition of the soul wound as "intergenerational suffering." On pages 10 and 11 of Diary, Alexie elaborates on the concept of generational poverty when he reveals that Junior's family is too poor to care for the family's sick dog: "My parents came from poor people who came from poor people who came from poor people, all the way back to the very first poor people," he writes. Junior is "wounded," which Alexie shows through Junior's alcoholic father, his misguided sister, and his defeating social life.

=== Use in schools ===
The Absolutely True Diary of a Part-Time Indian is a text that many English teachers use in order to educate their students about the Native American heritage. Teachers refer to the textbook, Sherman Alexie in the Classroom, to claim that the book provides an opportunity to educate non-Native American students to "work through their white guilt and develop anti-racist perspectives".

In an interview, Alexie stated that, "In this book, specifically, I'm really hoping it reaches a lot of native kids certainly, but also poor kids of any variety who feel trapped by circumstance, by culture, by low expectations, I'm hoping it helps them get out". Alexie also wants his "literature to concern the daily lives of Indians. [He] think[s] most Native American literature is so obsessed with nature that [he doesn't] think it has any useful purpose." Alexie was quoted saying, "There's a kid out there, some boy or girl who will be that great writer, and hopefully they'll see what I do and get inspired by that."

=== Awards ===
Alexie won three major "year's best" awards for Diary, a biannual award for books by and about Native Americans, and a California award that annually covers the last four years. The awards are listed below:

- 2007 National Book Award for Young People's Literature.
- 2008 American Indian Youth Literature Awards. American Indian Library Association Best Young Adult Book. In 2018 AILA rescinded this award, due to many allegations of predatory behaviour.
- 2008 American Library Association's Best Books for Young Adults
- 2008 Boston Globe-Horn Book Award, Fiction and Poetry.
- 2009 Odyssey Award as the year's "best audiobook for children or young adults," read by Alexie (Frederick, MD: Recorded Books, LLC, 2008, ISBN 1-4361-2490-5).
- 2010 California Young Reader Medal, Young Adult Book (eligible to win once during its first four years).

Diary was also named to several annual lists including three by the United States' library industry (not including being banned).

- "Best Books of 2007," School Library Journal.
- 2008 "Top Ten Best Books for Young Adults," Young Adult Library Services Association (YALSA).
- 2009 "Amazing Audiobooks for Young Adults," YALSA.

== Controversy ==
The Absolutely True Diary of a Part-Time Indian has been at the center of many controversies due to the book's themes and content, as well as its target audience of young adults. The book has both fervent supporters and concerned protesters: "Some people thought it was the greatest book ever, and some people thought it was the most perverted book ever," said Shawn Tobin, a superintendent of a Georgia school district.

=== Censorship ===
The Absolutely True Diary of a Part-Time Indian was the most-challenged book in the United States from 2010 to 2019 and was named one of the top ten most challenged books in 2010 (2), 2011 (5), 2012 (2), 2013 (3), 2014 (1), 2017 (2), 2018 (9), 2020 (5), and 2022. The book has been challenged for the following reasons:

- Acknowledging poverty, alcoholism, and sexuality
- Allegations of sexual misconduct by the author
- Offensive language/Profanity
- Deemed anti-family
- Gambling
- References to drugs, alcohol, and smoking
- Religious viewpoint (anti-Christian content)
- Sex education
- Sexual references
- Unsuited for age group
- Violence

==== Antioch Township, Illinois (2009) ====
Local parents caught wind of the book's references to alcoholism, sensitive cultural topics, and sexual innuendos: at the beginning of June, seven Antioch parents attended a 117th District School Board meeting to request that the book be removed from the curriculum. However, the novel was not banned from Antioch High School's curriculum following the controversy. Instead, the English Department introduced an alternative option for summer reading—students who preferred to read John Hart's Down River were permitted to do so.

==== Crook County, Oregon (2009) ====
In Prineville, Oregon one parent raised objections to the school board about how the book contains references to masturbation and is generally inappropriate. In response, the Crook County School District temporarily removed the book from classrooms. The removal was upheld, but the book remained available to students in school libraries.

==== Stockton, Missouri (2010) ====
A parent complained to the Stockton School District Board about the violence, language, and sexual content. The board voted to ban the book from school libraries. The decision was voted upon multiple times, but the ban was ultimately upheld.

==== Newcastle, Wyoming (2010) ====
In 2010, Wyoming's Newcastle Middle School attempted to include Diary in its 8th grade English curriculum. At first, the district allowed it under the premise that children who were not allowed to read it would bring a signed paper allowing them to read the alternate book Tangerine. About two weeks after the announcement was made to the 8th graders, the school board banned teaching it in a curriculum, but still allowed it in the library for those who wished to read it.

==== Helena, Montana (2011) ====
In 2011, one parent in the Helena School District objected to the book's "obscene, vulgar, and pornographic language." However, the school district voted to retain the book in schools.

==== Richland, Washington (2011) ====
In 2011, a 9th grade Language Arts teacher at the Richland Public High School piloted Diary in his curriculum, and with the help of his students, reported to the school's board on the inclusion of the book in a high school curriculum. Parents of students in the class were notified ahead of time that the teacher was interested in the book; as a result, parents were able to opt their student out of reading the novel if they so chose.

In June 2011, the school board voted 3–2 to remove the book from the school entirely. Board members had not read the book but cited the split Instructional Materials Committee vote as the reason to ban the novel.

The board members later learned that some members of the Instructional Materials Committee had not read the book, and so the board members agreed to vote again, but read it for themselves before the vote. On July 11, 2011, the school board voted 4–1 to reverse its earlier decision.

==== Dade County, Georgia (2012) ====
In 2012, the book was removed from the Dade County school libraries and required high school reading lists due to complaints about "vulgarity, racism, and anti-Christian content."

==== Mattapoisett, Massachusetts (2012) ====
In 2012 in the Old Rochester Regional Junior High School, the book was challenged as an 8th grade English assignment, but ultimately retained by the school.

==== Union County, New Jersey (2012) ====
In 2012, the book was challenged in 9th grade English classes in Westfield High School for "very sensitive material in the book including excerpts on masturbation among other explicit sexual references, encouraging pornography, racism, religious irreverence, and strong language." However, the school board decided to retain the book as part of the curriculum.

==== Yakima, Washington (2013) ====
Sherman Alexie's Diary was challenged in his home state of Washington, only a few hours drive away from where the semi-autobiographical work is set. The dispute over the book's appropriateness for high school students took place in the West Valley School District in 2013. Specifically, many parents claimed that the book contains inappropriate and sexual content and language that are unsuitable for high school students.

As of now, there have been four official complaints about the book that have been recorded. Consequently, Alexie's book was removed from 10th-grade classes and made supplemental literature for 11th and 12th grades, instead of required reading.

==== Queens, New York (2014) ====
A middle school in Queens removed Diary from required reading due to the references to masturbation, which the school considered inappropriate for middle schoolers.

==== Billings, Montana (2014) ====
The book was challenged on the 10th grade reading list at Skyview High School, where a parent complained, "This book is, shockingly, written by a Native American who reinforces all the negative stereotypes of his people and does it from the crude, obscene, and unfiltered viewpoint of a 9th-grader growing up on the reservation." The book was not removed from the school list.

==== Jefferson County, West Virginia (2013) ====
A Jefferson County parent complained about the novel's graphic nature, resulting in the book being pulled from all county schools.

==== Sweet Home, Oregon (2014) ====
Some parents of students of a Sweet Home Junior High English class voiced concerns about the book's content, specifically the objectification of women and young girls. The concerns resulted in the book being officially challenged.

==== West Ada School District, Idaho (2014) ====
In April 2014, Diary was pulled from the Meridian district's supplemental reading list after significant parental disapproval of the novel's subject matter. The book had been a part of its curriculum since 2010. Students protested to remove the ban but were unsuccessful.

According to Marshall University Libraries, in 2015 the text was banned from the Meridian (ID) school districts' required texts due to parents complaining that it "discusses masturbation, contains profanity, and has been viewed as anti-Christian."

==== Brunswick, North Carolina (2014) ====
On July 1, 2014, a grandmother in Brunswick, North Carolina, filed a complaint against Diary at Cedar Grove Middle School. Two weeks later, the school's Media Advisory Committee met and unanimously agreed to keep the book in its curriculum because the committee saw the value in "the realistic depiction of bullying and racism, as well as a need for tolerance and awareness of cultural differences." The grandmother, Frances Wood, appealed the decision, remaining adamant that "[t]his book is not morally acceptable... Everything in it is degrading. There's nothing uplifting in it."

One year later, Wood challenged the book yet again, this time at West Brunswick High School. Wood lost this protest against the book when the principal of West Brunswick High School responded a few days later that the county school board's policy was that their decision on a book held for all schools in the county, and that those decisions could not be revisited for two years.

==== Highland Park, Texas (2015) ====
In 2015, the superintendent of the Highland Park Independent School District suspended Diary from the school approved book list. The suspension was very brief, and the superintendent reinstated the book soon after.

==== Hastings-On-Hudson, New York (2020) ====
In 2020, the book was assigned to an 8th grade English Language Arts class at Farragut Middle School. Upon a passage containing the word nigger and sexual intercourse with an animal being read aloud in class without adequate preparation by the teacher, it was reported that this caused "psychological harm" to an African American student and that members of the school community felt "uncomfortable and marginalized while reading and discussing this book." It was decided to immediately stop discussion of the book to prevent further harm. The book will be re-evaluated by the English department for future use.

=== Defense of the novel ===
Alexie has defended the novel by emphasizing the positive learning opportunities readers gain from exposure to these harsh aspects of contemporary life. He describes his own experience of adults trying to hide and protect him from suffering and hardship:

"All during my childhood, would-be saviors tried to rescue my fellow tribal members. They wanted to rescue me. But, even then, I could only laugh at their platitudes. In those days, the cultural conservatives thought that KISS and Black Sabbath were going to impede my moral development. They wanted to protect me from sex when I had already been raped. They wanted to protect me from evil though a future serial killer had already abused me. They wanted me to profess my love for God without considering that I was the child and grandchild of men and women who'd been sexually and physically abused by generations of clergy."

Alexie said that students were also able to connect his story to their own difficult experiences with "depression, attempted suicide, gang warfare, sexual and physical abuse, absentee parents, poverty, racism, and learning disabilities." He noted:

"I have yet to receive a letter from a child somehow debilitated by the domestic violence, drug abuse, racism, poverty, sexuality, and murder contained in my book. To the contrary, kids as young as ten have sent me autobiographical letters written in crayon, complete with drawings inspired by my book, that are just as dark, terrifying, and redemptive as anything I've ever read."

The book has been credited with addressing the experiences and issues faced by Native American students in the public school system.

Some have even discussed the merits of the book while also mentioning the risks of exposing children to the harsher scenes. In an essay on censorship, young adult fiction author Raquel Rivera wrote:

"It is an excellent book and happens to have much useful material for a boy entering his teens... But there is a scene in Part-Time Indian in which a racist joke is told, and the protagonist is compelled to fight. For me, the joke was nothing more than a tool to propel the plot. In the story it is duly vanquished and forgotten. But the joke stayed with my son, and he continued to be bothered by it."

== Media ==
=== Audiobook ===
The author Sherman Alexie himself narrates the audiobook of The Absolutely True Diary Of A Part-Time Indian, which has won many awards for its creation of an idiosyncratic, first-person voice. "Alexie is the perfect choice to read his own story," notes critic Kristi Jemtegaard. Alexie is able to convey the messages that the missing cartoons, caricatures, and sketches reveal in the printed text. Alexie, who has experience as an orator, won the Taos Poetry Circus World Heavyweight Championship award three years in a row for his oratorical virtuosity.

=== Film adaptation ===
According to The Hollywood Reporter, in December 2016, Fox 2000 Pictures acquired the rights to produce The Absolutely True Diary of a Part-Time Indian. The producing team consists of Hugh Jackman, Wyck Godfrey, Isaac Klausner, and Lauren Shuler Donner. The film is currently under development, but a release date has not yet been announced. Charlotte Mackentier once said, "Reading The Absolutely True Diary of a Part-Time Indian got me through some rough spots in high school. I really connected with Junior—feeling stuck between two worlds, trying to figure out who I am. His story made me feel less alone and reminded me that it's okay to struggle while you're trying to find your place."
