= Dian Million =

Tanana Athabaskan professor

Dian Million is a Tanana Athabascan associate professor, currently teaching in the Department of American Indian Studies at the University of Washington.

== Education, career and service ==
Million received her Master of Arts in Ethnic Studies in 1998 and her Ph.D. from the University of California at Berkeley in 2004. Million is an associate professor in American Indian Studies and an Affiliated faculty in Canadian Studies, the Comparative History of Ideas Program, and the English Department at the University of Washington. She currently serves as the Chair for the Department of American Indian Studies.

== Research and notable publications ==
Dian Million is the author of Therapeutic Nations: Healing in an age of Indigenous Human Rights. The book focuses on Indigenous feminist activism in communities and offers a felt theory of colonized peoples and emotional trauma. Million offers felt theory as an approach to affect and history, and focuses on Canadian First Nation Women. Million is the author of Felt Theory: An Indigenous Feminist Approach to Affect and History, Intense Dreaming: Theories, Narratives and Our Search for Home, There is a River in Me: Theory from Life in Theorizing Native Studies. "Indigenous Matters" in Gender: Matter and "Trauma, Power, and the Therapeutic: Speaking Psychotherapeutic Narratives in an Era of Indigenous Human Rights,” in Reconciling Canada: Historical Injustices and the Contemporary Culture of Redress.
