= Millionaire (disambiguation) =

A millionaire is a person whose worth is at least one million in a unit of currency.

Millionaire may also refer to:

== Music ==
- Millionaire (band), a Belgian band
- Millionaires (duo), a 2000s Los Angeles all-female electronic music duo

=== Albums ===
- Millionaires (album), 1999, by James
- Millionaire (Kevin Welch album), 2002
- Millionaire, an EP by The Mekons

=== Songs ===
- "Millionaire" (Chris Stapleton song), 2017
- "Millionaire" (Cash Cash and Digital Farm Animals song), 2016
- "Millionaire" (Beady Eye song), 2011
- "Millionaire" (Kelis song), 2003
- "Millionaire", a song by the Cherry Poppin' Daddies' from Kids on the Street, 1996
- "Millionaire", a song by Felix Jaehn, featuring Tim Schou, from I (Felix Jaehn album), 2018
- "Millionaire", a song by the Mekons from I Love Mekons, 1993
- "Millionaire", a song by Plastilina Mosh, 2006
- "You Think I Ain't Worth a Dollar, But I Feel Like a Millionaire", a song by Queens of the Stone Age from Songs for the Deaf, sometimes abbreviated to "Millionaire", 2002

== Sports teams ==
- Vancouver Millionaires, a professional hockey team (1911–1922)
- Bangor Millionaires, a Bangor, Maine minor league baseball club (1894–1897)
- Melville Millionaires, a junior hockey team

== Other ==
- Millionaire (video game)
- Tony Millionaire (born 1956), American cartoonist, illustrator, and author
- Caramel shortbread, sometimes known as millionaire's shortbread

== See also ==
- The Millionaire (disambiguation), including The Millionairess
- Multi-Millionaire (disambiguation)
- One million (disambiguation)
- Super Millionaire (disambiguation)
- Who Wants to Be a Millionaire? (disambiguation), a game show franchise
