= Wellpinit, Washington =

Unincorporated community in Washington, United States

Wellpinit, Washington sčecuwe
- Unincorporated community
- Location within Washington (state)
- Coordinates: 47°53′17″N 117°59′17″W
- Country: United States
- State: Washington
- County: Stevens
- Elevation: 2,411 ft (735 m)
- Time zone: UTC-8 (Pacific (PST))
  - Summer (DST): UTC-7 (PDT)
- Area code: 509
- GNIS feature ID: 1512786

Wellpinit (Spokane: sčecuwe) is an unincorporated community in Stevens County, Washington, United States. Wellpinit has a post office with ZIP code 99040. It is the setting of the young adult novel, The Absolutely True Diary of a Part-Time Indian by Sherman Alexie. The population of the ZIP Code Tabulation Area for 99040 was 930 at the 2000 census.

The community is located on the Spokane Indian Reservation. It is served by the Wellpinit School District, which has a high school and middle school.

== Notable residents ==
- Sherman Alexie – Spokane author and filmmaker
