= One million (disambiguation) =

One million is the natural number following 999,999 and preceding 1,000,001.

One million or million may also refer to:

- A Greek or Byzantine mile (Ancient Greek: μίλλιον), composed of 8 stades (furlongs) or 5000 Greek feet
- For the year 1,000,000 AD see Timeline of the far future

== Entertainment ==
- "DC One Million", a crossover storyline published by DC Comics in 1998
- One Million B.C., a 1940 American film directed by Hal Roach
- One Million Years B.C., a 1966 British film directed by Don Chaffey, remake of the 1940 American film

=== Music ===
- "1.000.000" (song), by Alexandra Stan
- 1000000 (Million) (song), a 2018 song by Bon Iver
- "1,000,000", song by R.E.M. from the Chronic Town EP
- "1,000,000", song by Nine Inch Nails from their album The Slip

== Other topics ==
- Jack W. Hill (1928–1987), nicknamed the "One Millionth Marine" for having the service number 1000000 in the United States Marine Corps
- Million, Kentucky, a community in the United States
- The Travels of Marco Polo, or The Million, a transcription by Rustichello da Pisa of Marco Polo's travels between 1271 and 1298

== See also ==
- Milion, the Byzantine zero-mile marker in present-day Istanbul
- myr (million years), the unit for Mya (million years ago)
- Millionaire (disambiguation)
- Millions (disambiguation)
