= List of watercourses in Western Australia, I–L =

Western Australia has many watercourses with gazetted names, including rivers, streams, brooks, creeks, gullies, anabranches and backwaters.

This list is complete with respect to the 1996 Gazetteer of Australia. Dubious names have been checked against the online 2004 data, and in all cases confirmed correct. However, if any watercourses have been gazetted or deleted since 1996, this list does not reflect these changes. Strictly speaking, Australian place names are gazetted in capital letters only; the names in this list have been converted to mixed case in accordance with normal capitalisation conventions. Locations are as gazetted; some watercourses may extend over long distances.

== I ==
Name	Latitude	Longitude	Remarks
Icy Creek	32° 48' 20" S	116° 5' 34" E	
Iffley Brook	34° 13' 36" S	115° 47' 59" E	
Ikewah Brook	29° 10' 44" S	115° 29' 24" E	
Ilgarari Creek	24° 26' 53" S	120° 35' 51" E	
Ilkabiddy Creek	27° 24' 59" S	117° 4' 43" E	
Illirie Creek	23° 29' 36" S	115° 55' 38" E	
Impey River	26° 48' 21" S	116° 16' 25" E	
Indabiddy Creek	23° 34' 39" S	118° 23' 14" E	
Indagindi Creek	23° 57' 26" S	115° 3' 49" E	
Indera Creek	30° 36' 54" S	116° 17' 34" E	
Ingana Creek	15° 14' 1" S	127° 55' 37" E	
Inglis Creek	16° 33' 1" S	124° 30' 24" E	
Inlet River	34° 55' 2" S	116° 34' 4" E	
Intudacarra Brook	28° 44' 45" S	114° 48' 31" E	
Irgulba River	16° 26' 34" S	123° 51' 0" E	
Ironbark Creek	31° 49' 35" S	116° 48' 24" E	
Ironstone Gully	33° 45' 24" S	115° 14' 56" E	
Ironstone Gully	33° 20' 22" S	116° 4' 32" E	
Ironstone Gully	33° 39' 3" S	115° 42' 10" E	
Irregully Creek	23° 7' 10" S	116° 21' 36" E	
Irwin River	29° 15' 35" S	114° 55' 7" E	
Irwin River South	28° 57' 10" S	115° 32' 33" E	
Irybaroo Creek	24° 14' 14" S	114° 13' 50" E	
Isdell River	16° 26' 6" S	124° 50' 15" E	
Island Brook	33° 42' 54" S	115° 11' 8" E	
Italian Gully	30° 59' 33" S	121° 16' 47" E	
Ives Creek	26° 57' 35" S	120° 45' 11" E	

== J ==
Name	Latitude	Longitude	Remarks
Jack Hayes Creek	17° 3' 51" S	125° 42' 39" E	
Jackaneedup Creek	33° 46' 33" S	117° 16' 14" E	
Jackilup Creek	33° 35' 21" S	119° 52' 17" E	
Jackitup Creek	34° 2' 52" S	118° 1' 52" E	
Jacobs Gully	24° 58' 27" S	114° 52' 7" E	
Jacup Creek	33° 44' 40" S	119° 13' 12" E	
Jailhouse Creek	16° 27' 27" S	128° 12' 51" E	
Jam Creek	33° 56' 42" S	118° 8' 17" E	
Jam Creek	33° 53' 47" S	118° 1' 59" E	
James River	16° 14' 49" S	125° 33' 14" E	
Jane Brook	31° 51' 43" S	116° 0' 2" E	
Jane Creek	20° 36' 37" S	117° 43' 10" E	
Janet Creek	18° 43' 40" S	126° 52' 53" E	
Jangawarnanya Creek	15° 47' 5" S	124° 27' 23" E	
Jar Creek	25° 17' 41" S	115° 52' 32" E	
Jarnadup Brook	34° 15' 55" S	116° 4' 36" E	
Jarrah Creek	31° 52' 43" S	116° 10' 12" E	
Jarran Creek	18° 0' 29" S	124° 7' 59" E	
Jasper Brook	34° 23' 52" S	115° 45' 8" E	
Jasper Gorge	32° 21' 49" S	109° 42' 6" E	
Jaubert Creek	18° 56' 45" S	121° 35' 4" E	
Jayinjinha Creek	20° 49' 16" S	118° 5' 15" E	
Jd7 Creek	28° 20' 43" S	121° 41' 30" E	
Jedgelbing Brook	32° 18' 29" S	117° 8' 19" E	
Jeeaila River	24° 20' 50" S	117° 29' 5" E	
Jeegarnyeejip Branch	32° 34' 46" S	115° 46' 7" E	
Jeeleunup Gully	34° 35' 58" S	117° 41' 32" E	
Jenabillup Creek	33° 37' 54" S	121° 54' 56" E	
Jenamullup Creek	33° 57' 28" S	123° 9' 57" E	
Jennapullin Brook	31° 32' 14" S	116° 41' 2" E	
Jerdacuttup River	33° 55' 8" S	120° 14' 44" E	
Jerry Creek	16° 25' 47" S	127° 9' 57" E	
Jessop Creek	29° 28' 57" S	121° 18' 12" E	
Jigalong Creek	22° 57' 51" S	120° 22' 34" E	
Jim Crow Gully	31° 39' 22" S	116° 25' 28" E	
Jim Went Creek	33° 1' 37" S	117° 0' 31" E	
Jimblebar Creek	23° 10' 39" S	120° 11' 11" E	
Jimmawurrada Creek	21° 43' 50" S	116° 14' 54" E	
Jimmy Creek	23° 42' 55" S	115° 23' 27" E	
Jimperding Brook	31° 34' 46" S	116° 21' 54" E	
Jims Yard Creek	17° 11' 12" S	125° 55' 0" E	
Jinarnin Gully	33° 3' 15" S	118° 23' 14" E	
Jindardie Creek	28° 14' 21" S	121° 19' 19" E	
Jingaling Brook	31° 36' 47" S	116° 24' 31" E	
Jingarmup Creek	33° 34' 36" S	115° 2' 44" E	
Jingle Creek	25° 13' 18" S	116° 40' 16" E	
Jinnagunda Creek	21° 41' 6" S	116° 20' 22" E	
Jinunga River	16° 20' 24" S	123° 42' 37" E	
Joes Brook	31° 35' 8" S	116° 14' 23" E	
Joffre Creek	22° 8' 20" S	118° 16' 52" E	
Johnny Cake Creek	16° 48' 10" S	128° 51' 45" E	
Johnny Cake Creek	17° 2' 54" S	128° 34' 23" E	
Johns Creek	20° 38' 12" S	117° 11' 26" E	
Johnson Creek	26° 1' 8" S	126° 37' 17" E	
Johnson Creek	23° 6' 58" S	115° 18' 7" E	
Johnson Creek	14° 41' 39" S	126° 59' 40" E	
Johnston Creek	34° 56' 56" S	117° 57' 54" E	
Johnston Creek	18° 51' 6" S	126° 39' 59" E	
Johnston River	18° 17' 40" S	128° 0' 8" E	
Jolialgum Creek	15° 33' 42" S	124° 25' 42" E	
Jones Brook	31° 38' 57" S	116° 41' 2" E	
Jones Creek	16° 55' 3" S	128° 40' 59" E	
Jones Creek	21° 0' 55" S	118° 7' 14" E	
The Jones Creek	27° 34' 47" S	120° 28' 24" E	
Jones River	21° 3' 57" S	117° 14' 21" E	
Jones River	20° 49' 24" S	117° 21' 32" E	
Joshua Creek	33° 29' 42" S	115° 43' 55" E	
Jubricoo Creek	22° 31' 54" S	115° 17' 0" E	
Juill Juill Creek	26° 2' 32" S	121° 52' 12" E	
Julimar Brook	31° 34' 33" S	116° 16' 6" E	
Junction Brook	33° 0' 52" S	116° 53' 58" E	
Junction Creek	24° 34' 36" S	118° 8' 43" E	
Junction Creek	22° 35' 18" S	122° 7' 48" E	
Junction Creek	17° 3' 1" S	127° 33' 19" E	
Junction Creek	19° 15' 32" S	126° 8' 45" E	
Jungar Creek	27° 13' 56" S	117° 51' 51" E	
Jurendine Creek	31° 36' 19" S	116° 41' 19" E	

== K ==
Name	Latitude	Longitude	Remarks
K13 Creek	25° 22' 13" S	117° 6' 36" E	
Kaangalmun Creek	16° 19' 26" S	125° 17' 18" E	
Kadina Brook	31° 54' 27" S	116° 1' 5" E	
Kahrban Creek	25° 19' 56" S	122° 49' 50" E	
Kahrra Creek	25° 44' 49" S	122° 29' 42" E	
Kalgan Creek	23° 12' 6" S	119° 54' 57" E	
Kalgan River	34° 57' 8" S	117° 58' 33" E	
Kalguddering Creek	31° 0' 13" S	116° 43' 29" E	
Kallawia Creek	21° 44' 8" S	116° 15' 37" E	
Kallenia Creek	23° 40' 41" S	118° 7' 21" E	
Kallona Creek	22° 24' 59" S	120° 40' 58" E	
Kalumba Creek	16° 16' 47" S	125° 19' 58" E	
Kalyaltcha Creek	26° 19' 50" S	122° 38' 45" E	
Kalyeeda Creek	18° 29' 35" S	124° 42' 1" E	
Kammargoorh River	16° 25' 22" S	123° 42' 41" E	
Kangaroo Brook	32° 55' 43" S	116° 10' 10" E	
Kangaroo Creek	23° 13' 53" S	118° 4' 22" E	
Kangaroo Creek	16° 54' 57" S	125° 34' 15" E	
Kangaroo Creek	16° 22' 46" S	128° 34' 25" E	
Kangaroo Gully	32° 8' 57" S	116° 7' 12" E	
Kangeenarina Creek	21° 55' 19" S	117° 54' 52" E	
Kanjenjie Creek	21° 40' 46" S	117° 11' 17" E	
Karakin Brook	31° 5' 10" S	115° 28' 40" E	
Karbar Creek	26° 21' 30" S	116° 1' 6" E	
Karbar Creek	28° 15' 52" S	117° 18' 20" E	
Karinha Creek	20° 43' 47" S	117° 42' 54" E	
Karnet Brook	32° 23' 4" S	115° 54' 46" E	
Karra Creek	27° 40' 52" S	121° 4' 45" E	
Karrakin Gully	31° 52' 17" S	117° 23' 32" E	
Karri Creek	34° 57' 47" S	116° 59' 11" E	
Karri Karri Creek	25° 24' 9" S	120° 33' 51" E	
Karunjie Creek	16° 16' 57" S	127° 10' 46" E	
Katata Creek	28° 57' 24" S	121° 39' 19" E	
Kateup Creek	33° 47' 58" S	121° 38' 17" E	
Kebaringup Creek	34° 4' 29" S	118° 9' 57" E	
Keep River	15° 29' 38" S	129° 0' 0" E	
Keightly River	16° 45' 17" S	123° 58' 41" E	
Keith Creek	16° 24' 29" S	125° 35' 25" E	
Kelk Creek	16° 47' 38" S	122° 50' 17" E	
Kelkering Creek	31° 37' 38" S	117° 8' 58" E	
Kelley Creek	33° 55' 40" S	118° 59' 51" E	
Kelly Brook	34° 17' 17" S	116° 15' 19" E	
Kelly Creek	17° 18' 23" S	128° 54' 13" E	
Kellys Creek	34° 18' 24" S	119° 27' 27" E	
Keninup Creek	33° 57' 32" S	116° 32' 50" E	
Kennedy Creek	33° 50' 35" S	123° 1' 40" E	
Kennedy Creek	16° 14' 46" S	126° 30' 9" E	
Kennedy Creek	23° 39' 6" S	118° 1' 10" E	
Kennedy Creek	25° 44' 39" S	120° 49' 49" E	
Kent River	34° 59' 34" S	116° 59' 29" E	
Kettlerock Gully	32° 17' 52" S	116° 37' 13" E	
Ki-it Monger Brook	31° 41' 35" S	116° 0' 57" E	
Kiaka Brook	30° 29' 55" S	116° 0' 31" E	
Kidaides Creek	23° 23' 16" S	115° 26' 57" E	
Kildoonadarra Creek	28° 11' 54" S	122° 1' 39" E	
Kilkenny Creek	29° 3' 57" S	121° 43' 12" E	
Kilkenny Creek	28° 59' 2" S	121° 48' 13" E	
Killing Paddock Creek	21° 0' 58" S	117° 9' 13" E	
King Creek	34° 55' 51" S	118° 12' 26" E	
King Creek	16° 38' 40" S	124° 31' 10" E	
King Creek	31° 39' 23" S	116° 39' 57" E	
King David Creek	15° 41' 53" S	126° 28' 55" E	
King Edward River	14° 14' 3" S	126° 35' 58" E	
King George River	13° 57' 44" S	127° 19' 43" E	
King River	34° 56' 43" S	117° 56' 49" E	
King River	15° 29' 37" S	128° 4' 12" E	
Kingsman Brook	34° 51' 34" S	116° 27' 9" E	
Kiolowibri Creek	23° 20' 41" S	114° 43' 53" E	
Kirenia Creek	23° 38' 27" S	118° 58' 19" E	
Kirkalocka Creek	28° 37' 59" S	117° 42' 12" E	
Kirkpatrick Creek	28° 11' 20" S	122° 16' 16" E	
Kitchanning Brook	33° 45' 3" S	116° 31' 28" E	
Kitkittering Creek	31° 56' 28" S	117° 23' 24" E	
Kitto Creek	31° 38' 22" S	117° 13' 58" E	
Klausmann Creek	14° 10' 49" S	127° 38' 31" E	
Knackelup Creek	34° 9' 19" S	116° 30' 41" E	
Knox Creek	15° 29' 37" S	129° 0' 0" E	
Kockatea Gully	28° 32' 55" S	115° 10' 9" E	
Koginup Brook	34° 20' 11" S	116° 35' 50" E	
Kojonup Brook	33° 36' 51" S	116° 48' 49" E	
Kolanadgy Gully	28° 16' 21" S	115° 27' 56" E	
Kompup Creek	34° 42' 1" S	117° 13' 14" E	
Kondy Creek	22° 36' 6" S	120° 17' 52" E	
Kookenyia Creek	20° 40' 33" S	120° 6' 38" E	
Kookhabinna Creek	22° 56' 14" S	115° 58' 7" E	
Koolawerii Creek	15° 32' 5" S	127° 41' 51" E	
Koombararra Creek	23° 31' 14" S	115° 25' 54" E	
Koomoonboonah Creek	22° 10' 38" S	120° 17' 3" E	
Koondinee Creek	31° 35' 45" S	116° 31' 10" E	
Koongaling Creek	21° 2' 32" S	121° 9' 7" E	
Koorabooka Creek	24° 6' 34" S	116° 28' 27" E	
Kordabup River	35° 0' 13" S	117° 8' 15" E	
Korribinjal Brook	32° 19' 5" S	116° 1' 21" E	
Kubbine Brook	32° 30' 23" S	116° 49' 55" E	
Kujelan Creek	27° 32' 7" S	121° 29' 8" E	
Kukabubba Creek	26° 25' 52" S	120° 21' 23" E	
Kukerin Gully	33° 7' 28" S	117° 54' 54" E	
Kulbee Creek	22° 33' 45" S	119° 54' 16" E	
Kulele Creek	25° 58' 55" S	122° 10' 42" E	
Kuliba Creek	33° 47' 48" S	120° 11' 36" E	
Kulkinbah Creek	22° 26' 46" S	120° 10' 20" E	
Kumina Creek	21° 46' 47" S	116° 40' 1" E	
Kumpanapirra Creek	15° 1' 12" S	125° 24' 50" E	
Kuna Yuna Creek	21° 47' 58" S	127° 53' 0" E	
Kunbun Brook	27° 20' 13" S	116° 23' 54" E	
Kurrajong Creek	22° 2' 40" S	121° 6' 29" E	
Kurrajong Creek	17° 42' 29" S	125° 21' 24" E	
Kurrajong Creek	16° 44' 44" S	128° 35' 50" E	
Kurrajong Creek	17° 19' 21" S	128° 55' 44" E	
Kurrana Creek	22° 4' 58" S	120° 24' 40" E	
Kwokalup Creek	35° 1' 16" S	116° 55' 22" E	
Kyabram Brook	32° 46' 46" S	116° 1' 50" E	
Kyarup Creek	34° 2' 38" S	118° 20' 4" E	
Kybulup Creek	33° 44' 58" S	119° 56' 29" E	
Kylabumerup Creek	34° 11' 35" S	118° 14' 16" E	
Kyramup Creek	34° 5' 54" S	117° 55' 55" E	
Kyulgam River	16° 25' 39" S	123° 41' 56" E	

== L ==
Name	Latitude	Longitude	Remarks
Lacy Creek	18° 26' 30" S	128° 49' 11" E	
Lagoon Creek	16° 38' 4" S	128° 40' 24" E	
Lalalline Creek	25° 44' 32" S	122° 47' 14" E	
Lally Creek	18° 37' 17" S	126° 51' 27" E	
Lamb Creek	22° 44' 50" S	119° 0' 56" E	
Lambert Creek	33° 48' 46" S	117° 22' 45" E	
Lambo Creek	16° 8' 46" S	127° 11' 29" E	
Lamont Creek	17° 58' 11" S	127° 49' 43" E	
Landers Gully	35° 0' 20" S	116° 37' 13" E	
Landor River	25° 14' 4" S	116° 38' 39" E	
Landrigan Creek	18° 50' 14" S	126° 24' 32" E	
Lang Brook	32° 27' 22" S	116° 7' 46" E	
Langwell Creek	21° 16' 59" S	117° 33' 59" E	
Langwell Creek	21° 5' 47" S	117° 36' 33" E	
Laramun Creek	15° 8' 12" S	127° 53' 25" E	
Larrikin Creek	16° 7' 10" S	127° 8' 31" E	
Larry Creek	22° 36' 17" S	122° 23' 31" E	
Laugher Creek	18° 31' 44" S	127° 18' 0" E	
Laura River	18° 41' 47" S	127° 1' 0" E	
Laurie Creek	15° 7' 24" S	126° 42' 41" E	
Lauwa Creek	14° 18' 9" S	126° 38' 37" E	
Lawford Creek	19° 53' 9" S	126° 27' 57" E	
Lawlers Creek	28° 12' 48" S	120° 25' 4" E	
Lawley River	14° 39' 10" S	125° 55' 16" E	
Layman Brook	34° 2' 35" S	115° 30' 29" E	
Layman Gully	33° 32' 14" S	115° 32' 38" E	
Leamington Creek	32° 59' 16" S	116° 18' 18" E	
Lees Creek	17° 26' 46" S	128° 52' 9" E	
Lees Creek Centre	17° 32' 1" S	128° 57' 41" E	
Lees Creek North	17° 30' 58" S	128° 56' 54" E	
Lefroy Brook	34° 29' 57" S	116° 3' 7" E	
Lefroy River	33° 21' 7" S	117° 52' 1" E	
Leichardt Creek	15° 8' 18" S	125° 48' 16" E	
Leilira Creek	21° 17' 39" S	119° 15' 22" E	
Lennard Brook	31° 24' 18" S	115° 53' 52" E	
Lennard Brook Bindoon Branch	31° 23' 31" S	116° 1' 17" E	
Lennard River	17° 21' 22" S	124° 20' 0" E	
Leopold River	18° 15' 15" S	126° 14' 40" E	
Leppers Gully	32° 49' 29" S	116° 6' 39" E	
Lesmurdie Brook	31° 59' 56" S	116° 1' 0" E	
Letter Box Creek	16° 48' 49" S	128° 53' 6" E	
Lewers Creek	24° 51' 36" S	113° 40' 36" E	
Lewis Creek	19° 12' 31" S	128° 25' 44" E	
Liberba Creek	16° 26' 27" S	123° 50' 57" E	
Lifflie Creek	33° 44' 30" S	117° 51' 13" E	
Liga Creek	18° 17' 49" S	126° 38' 49" E	
Lightning Gully	33° 58' 32" S	115° 45' 58" E	
Lilian Creek	26° 20' 5" S	126° 58' 32" E	
Lillybooroora River	16° 38' 14" S	123° 55' 42" E	
Lily Creek	15° 46' 55" S	128° 44' 27" E	
Lily Hole Creek	16° 41' 34" S	125° 21' 42" E	
Limestone Creek	16° 38' 41" S	128° 36' 4" E	
Limestone Creek	23° 59' 11" S	119° 27' 15" E	
Limestone Creek	31° 55' 17" S	115° 57' 6" E	
Linacre Creek	17° 30' 5" S	128° 43' 49" E	
Linesman Creek	17° 58' 6" S	125° 6' 46" E	
Lion Mill Creek	31° 52' 47" S	116° 12' 29" E	
Lipseig Gully	33° 27' 24" S	117° 30' 4" E	
Little 2 Mile Creek	21° 31' 41" S	119° 25' 13" E	
Little Creek	21° 29' 4" S	120° 45' 17" E	
Little Darkin River	32° 1' 26" S	116° 14' 23" E	
Little Dry Creek	16° 39' 10" S	128° 48' 10" E	
Little Easter Brook	34° 10' 47" S	115° 47' 42" E	
Little Fitzroy River	17° 29' 5" S	126° 46' 58" E	
Little Gentle Annie Gully	18° 16' 23" S	127° 54' 8" E	
Little George River	20° 53' 46" S	117° 26' 38" E	
Little Gold River	18° 0' 5" S	126° 29' 15" E	
Little Jacup Creek	33° 49' 26" S	119° 14' 48" E	
Little Jimperding Brook	31° 35' 35" S	116° 21' 45" E	
Little Kurrajong Creek	16° 45' 36" S	128° 34' 55" E	
Little Lily Creek	15° 47' 35" S	128° 44' 42" E	
Little Limestone Creek	16° 38' 10" S	128° 38' 29" E	
Little Logue River	17° 39' 40" S	123° 23' 7" E	
Little Minnie Creek	24° 3' 25" S	115° 48' 55" E	
Little Morrissey Creek	24° 31' 6" S	116° 11' 46" E	
Little Napier Creek	34° 49' 59" S	117° 57' 35" E	
Little Panton River	17° 52' 51" S	127° 50' 29" E	
Little Pingandy Creek	23° 50' 11" S	117° 49' 7" E	
Little Quinninup Brook	34° 26' 8" S	116° 16' 58" E	
Little R B Creek	16° 56' 51" S	128° 56' 36" E	
Little River	34° 59' 42" S	117° 20' 4" E	
Little River	34° 53' 7" S	117° 7' 47" E	
Little River Creek	21° 29' 20" S	120° 44' 28" E	
Little Sherlock River	20° 48' 9" S	117° 26' 51" E	
Little Tarraji River	16° 42' 29" S	124° 9' 28" E	
Little Togo Creek	17° 38' 52" S	127° 47' 0" E	
Little Yunderup Branch	32° 35' 26" S	115° 45' 43" E	
Lizzie Creek	34° 22' 9" S	119° 21' 5" E	
Lockier River	29° 12' 39" S	115° 16' 19" E	
Lockwood Gully	31° 58' 46" S	117° 52' 22" E	
Log Creek	34° 16' 56" S	115° 58' 7" E	
Logue Brook	32° 59' 2" S	115° 54' 57" E	
Logue River	17° 38' 48" S	123° 25' 2" E	
Lombadina Creek	16° 33' 38" S	122° 48' 10" E	
Lonesome Gully	34° 18' 48" S	116° 15' 46" E	
Long Creek	34° 2' 8" S	118° 12' 0" E	
Long Creek	16° 38' 17" S	125° 22' 20" E	
Long Creek	33° 35' 12" S	119° 49' 47" E	
Long Gully	34° 2' 2" S	115° 48' 29" E	
Long Gully	34° 22' 41" S	117° 1' 59" E	
Long Gully	32° 57' 59" S	116° 18' 9" E	
Long Pool Creek	26° 33' 34" S	116° 30' 6" E	
Long Tin Creek	21° 42' 21" S	119° 29' 8" E	
Longbridge Gully	31° 15' 9" S	116° 5' 32" E	
Looingnin Creek	17° 39' 30" S	126° 48' 18" E	
Loombanariga Creek	15° 8' 38" S	127° 51' 51" E	
Loonjool Creek	14° 51' 55" S	126° 29' 10" E	
Lorikeet Creek	15° 8' 53" S	127° 4' 23" E	
Lorroomoondanee Creek	14° 59' 54" S	126° 17' 4" E	
Lort River	33° 48' 13" S	121° 11' 26" E	
Louden Creek	20° 52' 17" S	117° 50' 36" E	
Louisa River	18° 20' 45" S	126° 7' 3" E	
Lowya Creek	14° 55' 32" S	126° 13' 13" E	
Lucy Brook	32° 24' 26" S	116° 5' 21" E	
Ludlow River	33° 35' 38" S	115° 28' 13" E	
Lulu Creek	27° 53' 12" S	122° 29' 59" E	
Lulu Creek	20° 45' 36" S	116° 53' 59" E	
Lumbar Creek	18° 51' 2" S	126° 40' 28" E	
Lunenburgh River	33° 13' 52" S	115° 54' 25" E	
Lydarrba River	16° 22' 36" S	123° 42' 54" E	
Lyndon River	23° 36' 22" S	113° 51' 26" E	
Lyne River	14° 51' 50" S	128° 8' 6" E	
Lyons River	25° 7' 13" S	115° 8' 49" E	
Lyons River North	24° 17' 5" S	116° 52' 42" E	
Lyre Creek	21° 7' 59" S	117° 11' 59" E	

== See also ==
- Geography of Western Australia
