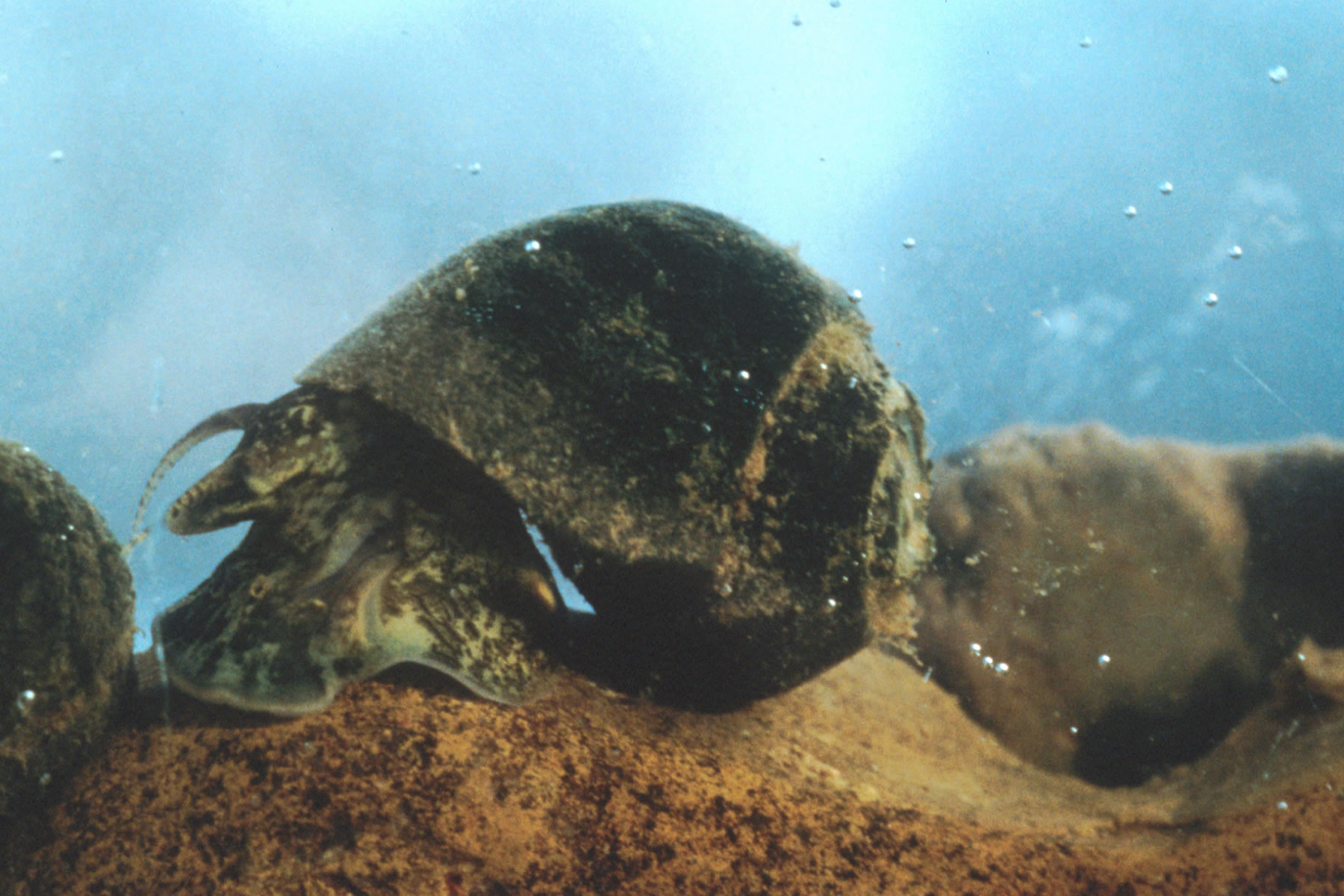
- A photo of Anthony's riversnail, Dick Biggens from USFWS.

Conservation status
- Vulnerable (IUCN 2.3)

- Critically Imperiled (NatureServe)

Scientific classification
- Kingdom: Animalia
- Phylum: Mollusca
- Class: Gastropoda
- Subclass: Caenogastropoda
- Order: incertae sedis
- Family: Pleuroceridae
- Genus: Athearnia
- Species: A. anthonyi

Binomial name
- Athearnia anthonyi (Redfield, 1854)

Synonyms
- Anculosa anthonyi Redfield, 1854

= Athearnia anthonyi =

Species of gastropod

Athearnia anthonyi, commonly known as Anthony's riversnail, is a rare species of freshwater snail in the family Pleuroceridae.

It is native to the Tennessee River system in the United States, but the three main populations occur in the main branch, from Marion County, Tennessee to Jackson County, Alabama, the Sequatchie River, ending at Marion County, Tennessee, and Limestone Creek in Limestone County, Alabama. Some experimental populations were also made along the Tennessee River in Alabama and Tennessee.

== Taxonomy ==
The genus Athearnia included two species, A. anthonyi and A. crassa, although the latter is now extinct, and A. anthonyi is the only species in this genus within Pleuroceridae. Athearnia used to be considered a subgenus of the Leptoxis genus in the Pleuroceridae family.

A main population of A. anthonyi snails that live in the Sequatchie River were compared to another species of snail, Leptoxis praerosa. One group of L. praerosa lived with the A. anthonyi snails is Sequatchie River, and the other group lived farther away, in Duck River. The groups of snails were compared through genetic information gathered by using allozyme electrophoresis. The genetic data from tissue sampling from all the populations of snails showed a large variation of allele frequencies at five different loci when comparing the two species, which marks A. anthonyi as its own species. Although, six other loci showed similar allele frequencies, supporting the Athearnia genus as being a subgenus of Leptoxis.

== Biology and morphology ==
Athearnia anthonyi has a lifespan of at least two years, but more studying is needed to see if this can possibly be longer. This species also has two known breeding seasons throughout the year.

The shells of A. anthonyi have whorls that start higher on the shell with a deep keel or ridge. As this species ages, the shells smooth out and has more similarities to L. praerosa shells. Adult A. anthonyi are larger than L. praerosa, at about 10 millimeters in length.

== Description ==
(Original description) The shell is rhomboidly ovate in shape and is covered with an olivaceous-yellowish epidermis. Beneath this outer layer, two purplish bands usually appear, encircling the body whorl. The spire remains relatively short and consists of approximately four whorls, though the upper ones are often found to be much eroded. The upper portion of the body whorl is distinctly shouldered by a series of four or five large, obtuse, and irregular tubercles. Furthermore, there is a slight tendency toward thickening in the ventral portion of the whorl.

The aperture is ovate and appears effuse at both the upper and lower margins. While the right lip is thin, the columellar lip is usually stained with purple above and below. This lip is reflected in a manner that partially covers a deep umbilical depression; however, this depression continues toward the base to form a channel that closely resembles the umbilical region found in the genus Natica.

== Habitat ==
Within the Tennessee River system, Anthony's riversnail occupies larger rivers with smooth rocks at the bottom, such as cobblestones. They also occupy creeks in areas with lower stretches and streaming water.

== Threats ==
The biggest threat to this species is the impoundment of the Tennessee River, which decreased and fragmented habitat along with increased urbanization along the area. This can include dredging and channeling, and makes the species more susceptible to genetic drift. Erosion and sedimentation through construction, agriculture, mining, and timbering activities contributes to population decline. Poor water quality due to pollutants also threatens this species. Pollutants can come from agriculture, industries, and civilizations, especially through runoff. Climate change is also thought to have an impact, especially with droughts. The entire historic range has declined more than 80%.

== Conservation efforts ==
The conservation status of this species is listed as vulnerable by the IUCN. However, other sources go further and consider this species endangered everywhere but the places where experimental populations are located.

Along with the natural main populations of this snail, two experimental populations were established in Alabama and Tennessee along the Tennessee River to focus on recovery efforts. The Limestone Creek natural population proved to have the best chance of survival between the three main populations, so a few thousand individual snails were moved from Limestone Creek to an experimental population in Alabama, from 2003 to 2008, near the Wilson Dam. However, establishing a new population with these individuals failed, and monitoring stopped in 2012, thought to be due to erosion in the area at the time. The other experimental population in Tennessee has not been commented on since the 2018 USFWS review.
