= Plum Creek (Niobrara River tributary) =

Stream in Nebraska, U.S.

Plum Creek Tributary to Niobrara River
- Location of Plum Creek mouth Plum Creek (Niobrara River tributary) (the United States)

Location
- Country: United States
- State: Nebraska
- County: Brown

Physical characteristics
- Source: confluence of North Fork and South Fork of Plum Creek
  - location: about 8 miles southwest of Johnstown, Nebraska
  - coordinates: 42°32′13.00″N 100°06′51.46″W
  - elevation: 2,598 ft (792 m)
- Mouth: Niobrara River
  - location: about 0.5 miles south of Meadville, Nebraska
  - coordinates: 42°45′6.00″N 099°51′16.43″W
  - elevation: 2,028 ft (618 m)
- Length: 42.34 mi (68.14 km)
- Basin size: 519.23 square miles (1,344.8 km^{2})
- Discharge
  - location: Niobrara River
  - average: 132.14 cu ft/s (3.742 m^{3}/s) at mouth with Niobrara River

Basin features
- Progression: Niobrara River → Missouri River → Mississippi River → Gulf of Mexico
- River system: Niobrara
- Tributaries
  - left: North Fork Plum Creek; Evergreen Creek; Little Minnie Creek; Sand Draw
  - right: South Fork Plum Creek; Coon Creek; Deep Creek
- Waterbodies: Pine Canyon Reservoir
- Bridges: US 20, Norden Avenue, Gobblers Roost Road

Plum Creek is a 42.34 mi (68.14 km) long fourth-order tributary to the Niobrara River in Brown County, Nebraska.

Plum Creek begins at the confluence of North and South Fork of Plum Creek in the Nebraska Sandhills about 8 miles (13 km) southwest of Johnstown, Nebraska and then flows generally northeast to join the Niobrara River about 0.5 miles (0.80 km) south of Meadville, Nebraska.

== Watershed ==
Plum Creek drains 517.23 square miles (1,339.6 km^{2}) of area, receives about 22.0 in/year (56 cm/year) of precipitation, and is about 2.52% forested.

== See also ==
- List of rivers of Nebraska
