= Sand Draw (Bone Creek tributary) =

Stream in Nebraska, U.S.

Sand Draw Tributary to Bone Creek
- Location of Sand Draw mouth Sand Draw (Bone Creek tributary) (the United States)

Location
- Country: United States
- State: Nebraska
- County: Brown

Physical characteristics
- Source: Calamus River divide
  - location: about 2.5 miles northwest of School No. 40
  - coordinates: 42°31′49.00″N 099°59′57.45″W
  - elevation: 2,596 ft (791 m)
- Mouth: Bone Creek
  - location: about 2.5 miles northeast of School No. 11
  - coordinates: 42°38′26.00″N 099°46′30.43″W
  - elevation: 2,221 ft (677 m)
- Length: 18.75 mi (30.18 km)
- Basin size: 46.10 square miles (119.4 km^{2})
- Discharge
  - location: Bone Creek
  - average: 4.90 cu ft/s (0.139 m^{3}/s) at mouth with Bone Creek

Basin features
- Progression: Bone Creek → Long Pine Creek → Niobrara River → Missouri River → Mississippi River → Gulf of Mexico
- River system: Niobrara
- Bridges: 878th Road, US 20, Rauschler Road, 880th Road, 881st Road, 428th Avenue, 429th Avenue, 430th Avenue, Meadville Avenue

Sand Draw is a 18.75 mi (30.18 km) long second-order tributary to Bone Creek in Brown County, Nebraska.

Sand Draw rises on the divide of the Calamus River in the Nebraska Sandhills about 2.5 miles (4.0 km) northwest of School No. 40 and then flows generally northeast to join Bone Creek about 2.5 miles (4.0 km) northeast of School No. 11.

== Watershed ==
Sand Draw drains 46.10 square miles (119.4 km^{2}) of area, receives about 22.8 in/year (58 cm/year) of precipitation, and is about 2.15% forested.

== See also ==
- List of rivers of Nebraska
