= Deep Creek (Plum Creek tributary) =

Stream in Nebraska, U.S.

Deep Creek Tributary to Plum Creek
- Location of Deep Creek mouth Deep Creek (Plum Creek tributary) (the United States)

Location
- Country: United States
- State: Nebraska
- County: Brown

Physical characteristics
- Source: Sand Draw divide
  - location: about 8 miles north-northeast of Johnstown, Nebraska
  - coordinates: 42°39′33.00″N 99°58′25.44″W
  - elevation: 2,400 ft (730 m)
- Mouth: Plum Creek
  - location: about 10 miles north-northeast of Johnstown, Nebraska
  - coordinates: 42°41′33.00″N 099°58′25.44″W
  - elevation: 2,208 ft (673 m)
- Length: 2.86 mi (4.60 km)
- Basin size: 7.33 square miles (19.0 km^{2})
- Discharge
  - location: Plum Creek
  - average: 0.91 cu ft/s (0.026 m^{3}/s) at mouth with Plum Creek

Basin features
- Progression: Plum Creek → Niobrara River → Missouri River → Mississippi River → Gulf of Mexico
- River system: Niobrara
- Tributaries
  - left: unnamed tributaries
  - right: unnamed tributaries
- Bridges: none

Deep Creek is a 2.86 mi (4.60 km) long second-order tributary to Plum Creek in Brown County, Nebraska.

Deep Creek rises on the Sand Draw divide in the Nebraska Sandhills about 8 miles (13 km) north-northeast of Johnstown, Nebraska and then flows generally north to join Plum Creek about 10 miles (16 km) north-northeast of Johnstown, Nebraska.

== Watershed ==
Deep Creek drains 7.33 square miles (19.0 km^{2}) of area, receives about 22.7 in/year (58 cm/year) of precipitation, and is about 9.52% forested.

== See also ==
- List of rivers of Nebraska
