= Willow Creek (Long Pine Creek tributary) =

Stream in Nebraska, U.S.

Willow Creek Tributary to Long Pine Creek
- Location of Willow Creek mouth Willow Creek (Long Pine Creek tributary) (the United States)

Location
- Country: United States
- State: Nebraska
- County: Brown

Physical characteristics
- Source: Calamus River divide
  - location: about 0.25 miles southeast of School No. 65
  - coordinates: 42°30′8.00″N 099°50′28.45″W
  - elevation: 2,535 ft (773 m)
- Mouth: Long Pine Creek
  - location: about 1 mile north of Long Pine, Nebraska
  - coordinates: 42°34′38.00″N 099°41′36.43″W
  - elevation: 2,202 ft (671 m)
- Length: 12.92 mi (20.79 km)
- Basin size: 36.22 square miles (93.8 km^{2})
- Discharge
  - location: Long Pine Creek
  - average: 3.98 cu ft/s (0.113 m^{3}/s) at mouth with Long Pine Creek

Basin features
- Progression: Long Pine Creek → Niobrara River → Missouri River → Mississippi River → Gulf of Mexico
- River system: Niobrara
- Bridges: 875th Road, 432nd Road, 876th Road, 433rd Road, 876th Road, 434th Road, 435th Road, Cowboy Trail Road, 436th Road, Ponderosa Road, US 20, Willow Ridge Avenue

Willow Creek is a 12.92 mi (20.79 km) long second-order tributary to Long Pine Creek in Brown County, Nebraska.

== Course ==
Willow Creek rises on the divide of the Calamus River in the Nebraska Sandhills about 0.25 miles southeast of School No. 65 and then flows northeast to join Long Pine Creek about 1 mile (1.6 km) north of Long Pine, Nebraska.

== Watershed ==
Willow Creek drains 36.22 square miles (93.8 km^{2}) of area, receives about 23.0 in/year (58 cm/year) of precipitation, and is about 4.93% forested.

== See also ==
- List of rivers of Nebraska
