= Fayetteville–Manlius High School =

High school in Manlius, New York

Fayetteville-Manlius High School

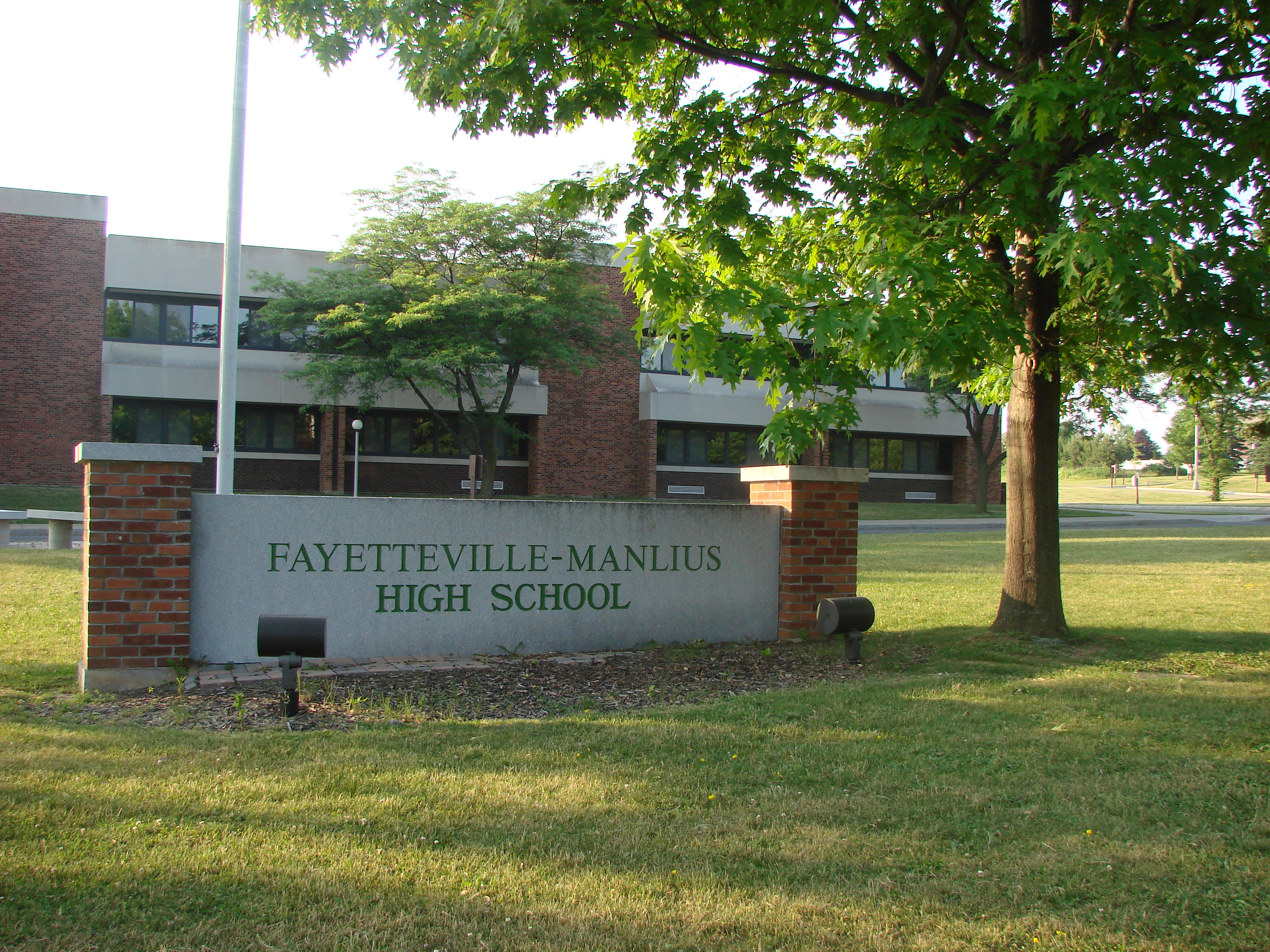

Location
- 8201 E Seneca Turnpike; Manlius, New York 13104; United States; 43.009167°N 75.96°W

Information
- Type: Public
- Motto: "Building on Excellence"
- Established: 1963
- School district: Fayetteville-Manlius Central School District
- NCES School ID: 361833001656
- Principal: Patrick McNamara
- Teaching staff: 105.51 (on an FTE basis)
- Grades: 9-12
- Enrollment: 1,380 (2023-2024)
- Student to teacher ratio: 13.08
- Campus: Suburban
- Colors: Green and White
- Mascot: Hornets
- Yearbook: Oakleaves
- Website: Official website

Fayetteville–Manlius High School (also F-M High School or FMHS) is a comprehensive New York public high school on East Seneca Turnpike in the Town of Manlius, serving grades 9–12 in the Fayetteville-Manlius Central School District. It is the only high school in the district, and is the successor to both Wellwood Middle School and Eagle Hill Middle School. The school is governed under the authority of the New York State Education Department, whose standardized examinations are designed and administered by the Board of Regents of the University of the State of New York.

== History ==
Fayetteville–Manlius High School was opened in 1963 after the 1951 merger of then separate Fayetteville and Manlius school districts and subsequent need to consolidate students into a single high school. Upon this opening, a major school restructuring was implemented, as the Fayetteville High School became Wellwood Middle School and Manlius High School became Pleasant Street Elementary (which closed in 1975). A new middle school, Eagle Hill, was also opened directly next to the high school in 1965. Space requirements, due mainly to ballooning enrollment and continued reorganization as a result of the 1951 merger, prompted the district to relocate Eagle Hill to a new building on a new campus in 1972, so the high school could expand into the junior high's previous facilities. This expansion, which connected the two buildings, now called House 2 and House 1, by a hallway and an enclosed footbridge, nearly doubled the school's footprint. F-M High School served grades 12 through 10 until 1976, when the two junior high schools became middle schools, and FM High took in 9th graders.

=== Administration ===
Former principal of Mott Road Elementary School and vice principal of Fayetteville–Manlius High School itself, Patrick McNamara was selected to replace interim principal John Durkee, himself replacing longtime principal Raymond W. Kilmer, III (now superintendent of Oswego City School District), and legally began his reign on July 1, 2024.

=== Traditions ===
Many of the school's traditions stem from the fact that decades ago, hornets nested in a 200-year-old oak tree that formerly stood on the old high school campus (now Wellwood Middle School). Because of this, the athletic teams' mascots are the Hornets, and several of the names used for the school newspaper over the years have been hornet-related (see Extracurriculars, below).

The school alma mater gives tribute to the original tree in its opening stanza, "Guarded by the old oak tree...". The alma mater is set to the melody of "Aura Lee". Its lyrics are attributed to teacher Richard Rhoades "and his music composition class". The motif can also be seen in the school colors (green and white), in the district logo, and in the name of the school yearbook (Oakleaves).

== Demographics ==
There are currently 1,405 students enrolled at F-M High School and 130 faculty members, for a student-teacher ratio of approximately 14:1.

As of the 2005–06 school year, the racial/ethnic makeup of the student population was 91.8% White, 2.7% Black or African American, 4.4% Asian or Pacific Islander, and 0.8% Hispanic. Approximately 0.5% of the population, or 8 students, demonstrated limited English proficiency. Approximately 0.8% of students qualified for a reduced-price lunch, and another 3.5% were eligible for a free lunch. Since then the Asian student population has increased significantly, and now makes up almost 10% of the school's population.

== Academics and extracurriculars ==
=== Curriculum ===
The school focuses on graduating all students with the minimum of a Regents Diploma, but some may also graduate with a less advanced local diploma. The Regents Diploma with Advanced Designation may be achieved with extended studies in a foreign language.

Though the curriculum is developed and sanctioned by the New York State Department of Education, and classes are developed to prepare students to achieve success on the required Regents Examinations, most core courses offer one or two components that explore more advanced topics. The school offers standard level Regents courses, but also offers more advanced Honors courses, Interdisciplinary courses (in English and History), Advanced Placement (AP) courses, as well as Syracuse University courses offered through Syracuse University Project Advance (SUPA). SU courses offered through Project Advance are taught at the high school by F-M faculty members (qualified by the university), and follow the same curriculum and are given the same credit as courses taught at the university. A large percentage of students opt to take SU courses offered through Project Advance instead of AP classes because their equally challenging curriculum is often more widely accepted for transfer credit by the students' successive colleges or universities.

F-M is part of an extremely small percentage in the country that does not rank students publicly with the exception of awarding valedictorian to a graduating senior. The school also uses a 100 grade point scale, as opposed to the much more common 4.0 scale, and weighs the GPA based on class difficulty level (Regents, Honors, AP, etc.). In addition, the athletic department does not participate in academic All-America honors.

=== Notable achievements ===
- Science Olympiad National Champions in 2004
  - Other National Finishes: 3rd Place: 2005. 4th Place: 2000, 2001, 2006, 2007, 5th Place: 2009
  - New York State Championships in ten consecutive years 2003–2012, 2014, and 2018.
- 2005 gold medal and 2006 blue ribbon, Expansion Management magazine's Education Quotient
- 1999, 2000, and 2006 GRAMMY Signature School
- Six-times named one of the American Music Conference's "Best 100 Communities for Music Education in America".
- The high school is consistently honored by the Scholastic Art and Writing Awards as having one of the best art programs in the country. In 2006, students from the high school received a record number of national awards, including the prestigious National American Vision Award.
- The district consistently exceeds average state and national performances on the SAT. In addition, 99% of F-M students take the exam at least once. The average scores for the Class of 2010 are as follows:

	F-M	State	Nation
Critical Reading	565	484	501
Math	593	499	516
Writing	560	478	492
TOTAL	1718	1461	1509

=== Graduation data ===
In 2006, the school graduated 100% of its senior class, 69% of whom received a Regents Diploma with Advanced Designation, and 28% of whom received a Regents Diploma. Of these graduating students, 98% continued on to higher education, 84% to a four-year college, and 14% to a two-year college. Of the remaining graduates, 1% continued into the workforce, and another 1% had unknown plans. The dropout rate also remained under 1%, about half of whom enrolled in a High School Equivalency or GED program.

=== Extracurriculars ===
The student activities program offers more than fifty clubs and activities in a wide range of interests. Student-run publications include the Oakleaves yearbook, the student newspaper called The Buzz (formerly The Sting, formerly the Hornet's Nest), and a literary magazine, Voices.

The school has a Quizbowl team (which has appeared in International Academic Competitions' National History Bowl in Crystal City, Virginia) and Amnesty International Club. Fayetteville-Manlius also boasts a Model United Nations club with more than a hundred participants. The club hosts an annual Central New York MUN Conference (CNYMUN), often inviting over a thousand delegates from around New York. Another extracurricular area in which the Hornets excel is Mock Trial, where in 2016, Fayetteville–Manlius High School won the New York State Mock Trial Championship with an undefeated season record. In 2020, they placed third in the same competition.

The school has a chamber orchestra, string orchestra, concert orchestra, symphony orchestra, jazz ensemble, two bands, concert band, and wind ensemble as well as a very powerful Pep Band, and three vocal groups: choir, the select group's chorale, and Swing 16. The school also has the top Ukulele Ensemble in the Central New York area.

FM also has three major stage productions during the year. The final production of the year, called Showboat, is the annual student-run talent show, a tradition reaching back several decades. Fayetteville–Manlius High School also hosts a π memorization contest, which along with other events, culminates in an annual assembly called "pi day", which typically takes place on March 14 (the date signifies the first three digits of pi.) The assembly includes song performances as well as competitions.

== Athletics ==
F-M's 32 varsity teams compete in the Metro Division of the SCAC, Section III of the New York State Public High School Athletic Association (NYSPHSAA), and Section III of the New York State Scholastic Rowing Association. The teams include:

Fayetteville-Manlius sports teams
Season:	Girls:	Boys:
Fall	cheerleading, cross country, field hockey, gymnastics, soccer, swimming, tennis, volleyball	cross country, football, golf, soccer, volleyball, cheerleading
Winter	basketball, bowling, cheerleading, indoor track	basketball, bowling, ice hockey, indoor track, swimming, wrestling, cheerleading
Spring	crew, golf, lacrosse, softball, track	baseball, crew, lacrosse, tennis, track

The Hornet, F-M's school mascot, a recolored version of Georgia Tech's mascot, Buzz. This version has since been redesigned.

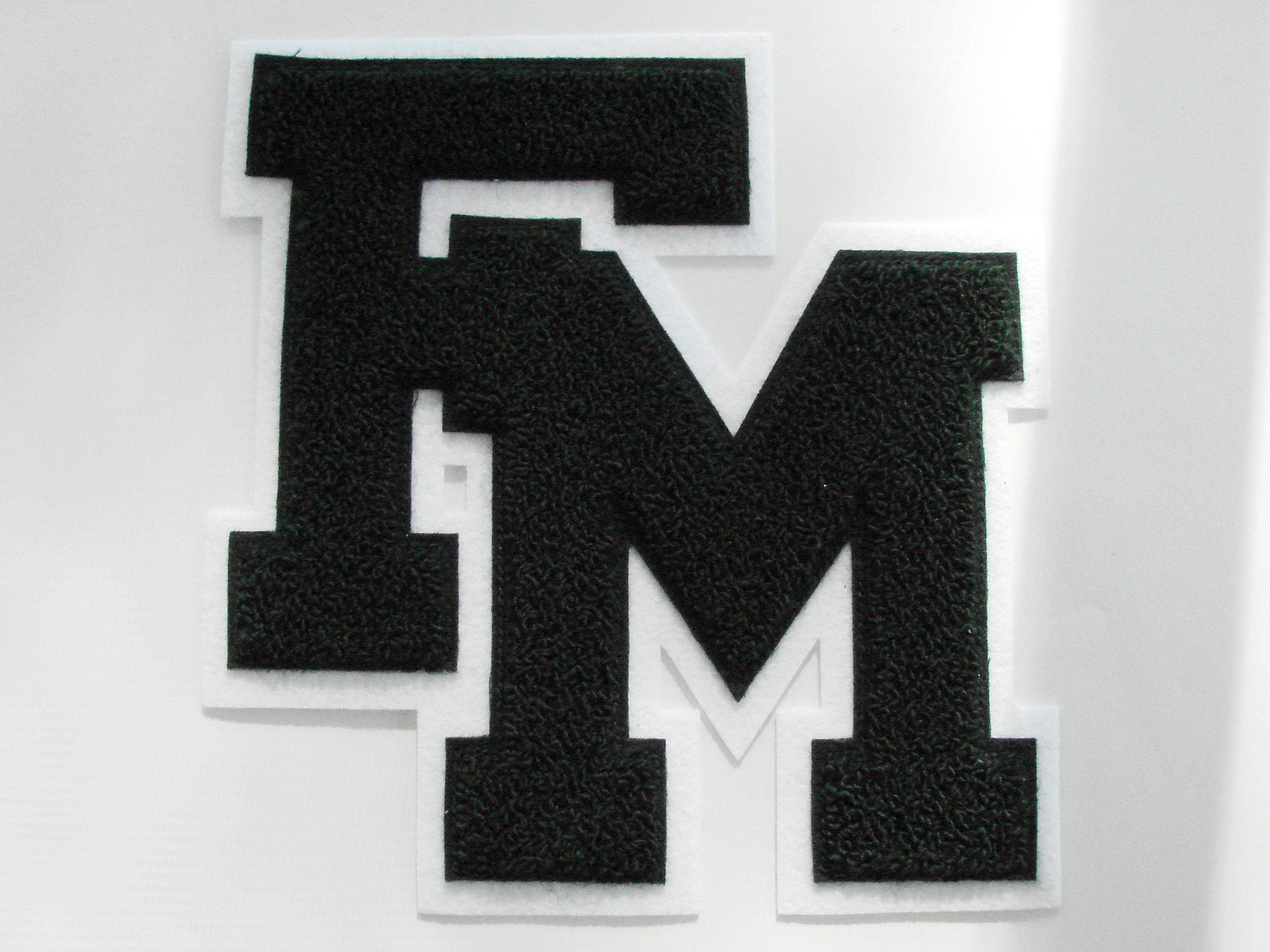
The varsity letter awarded by FMHS

=== Notable athletic achievements ===
- Girls' Cross Country
  - 11 National Championships in 12 Seasons (seven consecutive): 2006, 2007, 2008, 2009, 2010, 2011, 2012, 2014, 2015, 2016, and 2017 Nike Cross Nationals Champions
  - Second at Nike Cross Nationals: 2013
  - Ranked #1 in the nation (as of 01/01/18)
  - 2006—2010 NYSPHSAA Class AA Champions & 1997 NYSPHSAA Class A Champions.
  - 2006 & 2007 NYS Federation Champions.
- Boys' Cross Country
  - Ranked #2 in the nation (as of 01/01/17)
  - 2nd Place, 2004 & 2010, and 3rd place, 2005 — Nike Cross Nationals
  - 1997, 2004 & 2005 NYS Federation Champions
  - 2004, 2009, 2013 & 2014 NYSPHSAA Class AA Champions & 1997 NYSPHSAA Class A Champions
  - 2014 Nike Cross Nationals Team Champions
- Boys' Outdoor Track
  - 2006 National Champion 4x1 Mile Relay (meet, Section III and NYSPHSAA record time) and 2nd Place Distance Medley Relay, 2006 Nike Outdoor Nationals
- Boys' Indoor Track
  - 2006 National Champion 4x1 Mile Relay (meet record time), 2006 Nike Indoor Nationals
- Girls' Lacrosse
  - National Rankings: #4 (2004) and #3 (2005) by LaxPower
  - 2004 & 2005 NYSPHSAA Class A Champions and 2006 NYSPHSAA Class A Runners-up
- Boys' Lacrosse
  - 1988 NYSPHSAA Class A Runners-up
  - 1993 NYSPHSAA Class A Runners-up
  - 2014 NYSPHSAA Class A Runners-up
- Girls' Crew
  - 1st Place, Girls 2nd 8+, 2006 New York State Scholastic Rowing Association (NYSSRA) Championships
  - 1st Place, Girls V8+, 2009 Section 3 Champions
  - 1st Place, Girls JV4+, 2011 National Champions
- Girls' Tennis
  - 2003 & 2004 NYSPHSAA Doubles Champions
  - 26 consecutive Section III titles
  - undefeated from 1993 to 2014
- Boys' Tennis
  - 13 consecutive Section III titles
  - undefeated from 1995 to 2019.
- Girls' Swimming
  - 1994 and 1995 Section III Class A Champions
  - 2016—Present NYSPHSAA Section III Class A Champions
  - 2016, 2018, 2019 George Farwell Cup Winners
  - 2018, 2019 Empire 8 Invitational Winners
- Baseball
  - 2019 & 2022 Section III Class AA Champions
  - 2022 NYS Class AA Regional Champions
  - 2022 NYS Class AA State Runner-Up

== Facilities ==
The science wing, opened in 1998, includes eight laboratories and a large group instruction room. The "overpass", at the middle of the school (now closed), connected its two main sections; "House 1" (primarily English and Social Studies) and "House 2" (primarily Science, Mathematics, and Technology). The school also opened a new Art Wing in 2000. Subsequent additions and renovations have allowed the school to keep up with advances in technology, increases in enrollment, and changes in curriculum.

- Two new wings for science and music and a renovated library media center were opened in 1998, followed by a renovation of the auditorium in 1999.
- Since 1998, the school has opened seven computer labs spread throughout the school, in an ongoing commitment to making contemporary technology accessible to all students. Together, these labs contain almost 200 computers, in addition to around 10 student accessible computers in every classroom.
- In 2000, to accommodate the school's nationally renowned, award-winning art programs, the district opened one of the most extensive art facilities of any public school system in Upstate New York. The new wing includes classrooms and studio space for drawing, painting, ceramics, sculpture, and digital media. Existing photography facilities remained intact and have since been updated to accommodate digital technologies.
- 2001 saw the opening of a television studio, FMTV, which develops and broadcasts a student-run morning news program and special events to every classroom in the school.
- In 2003, after acquiring farmland adjacent to the campus, the school opened a new access road, expanded student parking lot, and additional athletic fields. Consolidated maintenance facilities, and an observatory opened in 2004, also as a result of this acquisition.
- An expanded counseling suite and administrative office was opened in 2004.
- The fitness center was expanded in 2008. The overpass was renovated and numerous classrooms were re-purposed.
- During the Summer of 2011, the football stadium was renovated, and a new turf field was installed after a donation of $1.4 Million by the F-M Community Sports Facility Association.
- During the Summer of 2019, the Library Media Center and bathrooms were renovated.
- During the 2019–2020 school year, an ongoing project has seen the replacement of fluorescent hallway and classroom lighting to LED lights.
- During the 2021-2022 school year, a $52,000,000 multi-year renovation was approved in a 611-438 vote
- During the 2023-2024 school year, the famed "overpass" was closed and several areas went under even more intense construction.

== Notable incidents ==
=== "Grinding" ===
During the 2006–2007 school year, the school gained national attention due to controversial policies implemented at school-sponsored dances. Catching the attention of The New York Times in a December 17, 2006 article, was the decision by principal James Chupaila to ban "grinding", or any forms of perceived "suggestive dancing styles", at school dances, and to cancel one dance altogether for fear it could become a moral and legal liability.

=== Cheating scandal ===
During the 2007–2008 school year, F-M was again in the news when the FBI was consulted in an investigation at Fayetteville–Manlius High School. At a faculty meeting Administrators disclosed that there was breach in computer network security. One student was caught trying to remove an electronic monitoring device (a hardware keylogger) from a school computer on October 24, 2007. Another student was caught trying to break into the school earlier that day, and the third was found waiting in a nearby car. Further investigation implicated eight students altogether, two of them graduates attending college (Syracuse University and Johns Hopkins University). The students faced criminal charges, some of them charged with multiple felonies.

== Notable alumni ==
The school district, in conjunction with the Fayetteville-Manlius Education Foundation, has instituted a Fayetteville-Manlius Hall of Distinction, which is said "to recognize and celebrate Fayetteville-Manlius for the accomplishments of its graduates." These are some of the notable alumni who have been inducted, among many others:

2000

- Steve Altes, humorist and graphic novelist - Class of 1980
- Tom Rafferty, former NFL player - Class of 1972
- Chris Wedge, Academy Award-winning filmmaker - Class of 1975
- Christopher Moeller, comic book artist, writer, and illustrator - Class of 1981

2004

- Laurie Halse Anderson, children's author and young adult novelist - Class of 1979
- Jonathan Murray, co-creator of MTV's The Real World - Class of 1973

2009

- Nina Fedoroff, science and technology adviser to U.S. Secretary of State Hillary Clinton - Class of 1960

Not inducted

- Winnie Anderson, former NFL player - Class of 1931
- Bob Kuziel, former NFL player - Class of 1967
- Ashley Twichell, Olympic swimmer; 2019 Fayetteville-Manlius Hornets Hall of Fame inductee - Class of 2007
