= Koshopah, Nebraska =

Unincorporated community in Nebraska, United States

- Unincorporated community
- Location within Nebraska Location within the United States
- Coordinates: 42°06′04″N 100°06′15″W
- Country: United States
- State: Nebraska
- County: Brown
- Time zone: UTC-6 (Central (CST))
  - Summer (DST): UTC-5 (CDT)
- Area code: 402
- GNIS feature ID: 835353

Koshopah is an unincorporated community in Brown County, Nebraska, United States.

== History ==
A post office was established at Koshopah in 1920, and remained in operation until it was discontinued in 1957.
