= Short Pine Creek =

Stream in Nebraska, U.S.

Short Pine Creek Tributary to Long Pine Creek
- Location of Short Pine Creek mouth Short Pine Creek (the United States)

Location
- Country: United States
- State: Nebraska
- County: Rock

Physical characteristics
- Source: Elkhorn River divide
  - location: about 4 miles southeast of Winfield School
  - coordinates: 42°39′17.00″N 099°37′36.00″W
  - elevation: 2,245 ft (684 m)
- Mouth: Long Pine Creek
  - location: about 0.5 miles southeast of School No. 69
  - coordinates: 42°42′26.00″N 099°38′29.42″W
  - elevation: 1,949 ft (594 m)
- Length: 3.98 mi (6.41 km)
- Basin size: 22.84 square miles (59.2 km^{2})
- Discharge
  - location: Long Pine Creek
  - average: 2.62 cu ft/s (0.074 m^{3}/s) at mouth with Bone Creek

Basin features
- Progression: Long Pine Creek → Niobrara River → Missouri River → Mississippi River → Gulf of Mexico
- River system: Niobrara
- Bridges: none

Short Pine Creek is a 3.98 mi (6.41 km) long first-order tributary to Long Pine Creek in Rock County, Nebraska. This is the only stream of this name in the United States.

== Course ==
Short Pine Creek rises on the divide of the Elkhorn River in the Nebraska Sandhills about 4 miles (6.4 km) southeast of Winfield School and then flows north-northwest to join Long Pine Creek about 0.5 miles (0.80 km) southeast of School No. 69.

== Watershed ==
Short Pine Creek drains 22.84 square miles (59.2 km^{2}) of area, receives about 23.4 in/year (59 cm/year) of precipitation, and is about 4.07% forested.

== See also ==
- List of rivers of Nebraska
