= Little Minnie Creek =

Stream in Nebraska, U.S.

Little Minnie Creek Tributary to Plum Creek
- Location of Little Minnie Creek mouth Little Minnie Creek (the United States)

Location
- Country: United States
- State: Nebraska
- County: Brown

Physical characteristics
- Source: Sand Draw divide
  - location: about 10 miles northeast of Woodlake, Nebraska
  - coordinates: 42°40′48.00″N 100°08′20.45″W
  - elevation: 2,550 ft (780 m)
- Mouth: Plum Creek
  - location: about 8 miles north-northeast of Johnstown, Nebraska
  - coordinates: 42°39′37.00″N 100°03′48.49″W
  - elevation: 2,337 ft (712 m)
- Length: 4.37 mi (7.03 km)
- Basin size: 21.74 square miles (56.3 km^{2})
- Discharge
  - location: Plum Creek
  - average: 2.50 cu ft/s (0.071 m^{3}/s) at mouth with Plum Creek

Basin features
- Progression: Plum Creek → Niobrara River → Missouri River → Mississippi River → Gulf of Mexico
- River system: Niobrara
- Tributaries
  - left: unnamed tributaries
  - right: unnamed tributaries
- Bridges: none

Little Minne Creek is a 4.37 mi (7.03 km) long first-order tributary to Plum Creek in Brown County, Nebraska. This is the only stream of this name in the United States.

== Course ==
Little Minnie Creek rises on the South Fork Fairfield Creek divide in the Nebraska Sandhills about 10 miles (16 km) northeast of Wood Lake, Nebraska and then flows generally southeast to join Plum Creek about 8 miles (13 km) northeast of Johnstown, Nebraska.

== Watershed ==
Little Minnie Creek drains 21.74 square miles (56.3 km^{2}) of area, receives about 22.2 in/year (56 cm/year) of precipitation, and is about 0.45% forested.

== See also ==
- List of rivers of Nebraska
