= Genesee Street Hill–Limestone Plaza Historic District =

Historic district in New York, United States

- U.S. National Register of Historic Places
- U.S. Historic district
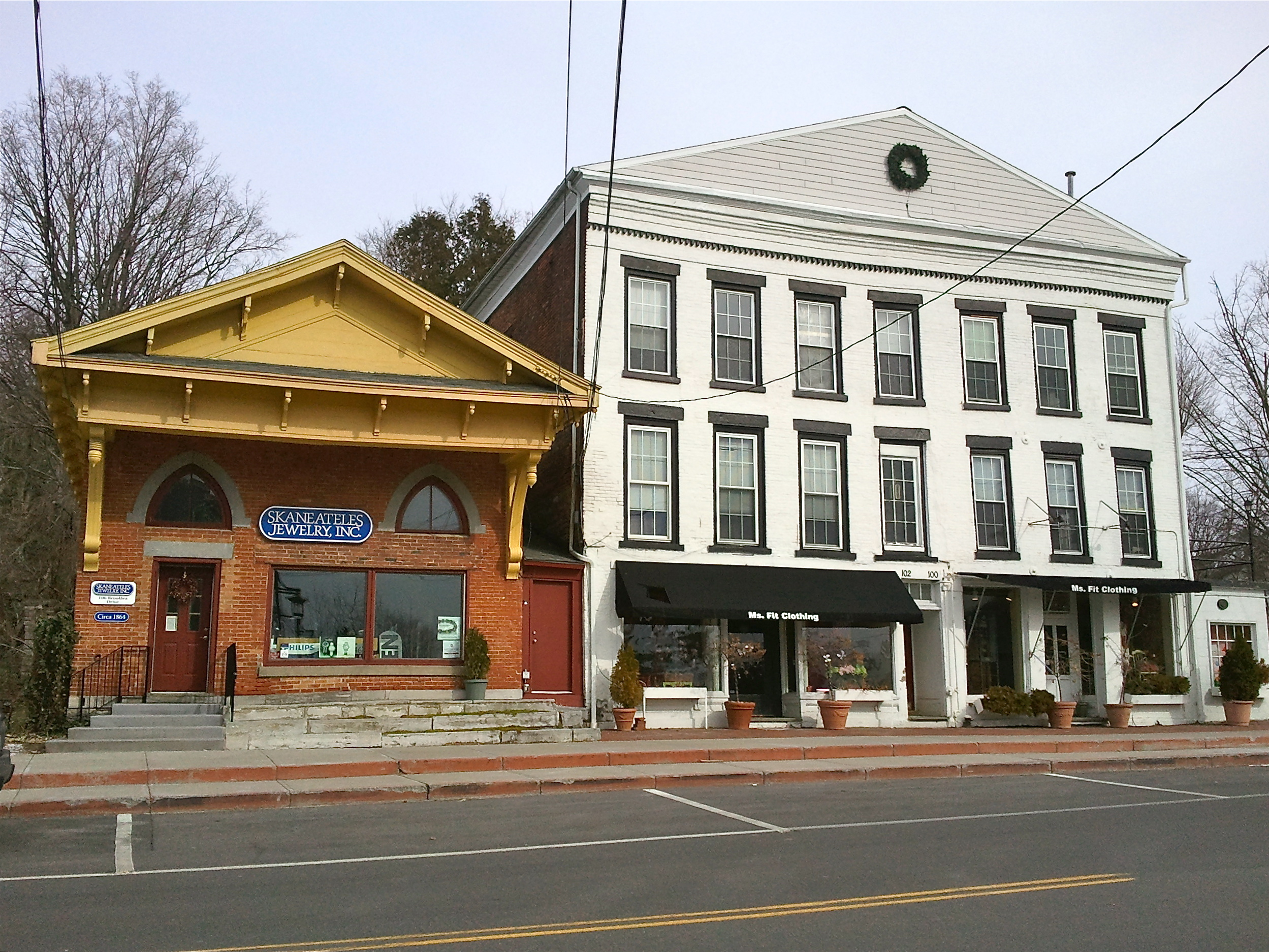

- Location within New York Location within the United States
- Location: Roughly both sides of Genesee St., from Chapel St. to Limestone Plaza, Fayetteville, New York
- Coordinates: 43°1′46″N 76°0′36″W
- Area: 12 acres (4.9 ha)
- Built: 1820
- Architect: Multiple
- Architectural style: Italianate, Federal, Greek Revival
- NRHP reference No.: 82003392
- Added to NRHP: July 29, 1982

The Genesee Street Hill–Limestone Plaza Historic District is a historic district in Fayetteville, New York that was listed on the National Register of Historic Places in 1982. The western border of the district is Limestone Creek. The district includes multiple Greek Revival houses, as well as Italianate and Federal architecture styles, along East Genesee Street as it rises from Limestone Plaza to Chapel Street, near the top of East Genesee Street Hill (which is the village center of Fayetteville).

It includes a 12 acres (4.9 ha) area.

== Grover Cleveland boyhood home ==
The district includes the boyhood home of U.S. President Grover Cleveland, one house away from Genesee Street.
