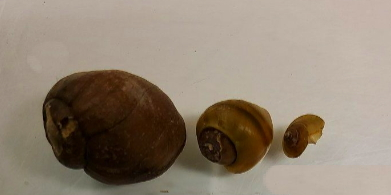
- Shell of Athearnia crassa (specimen at the Smithsonian Institution)

Conservation status
- Extinct (IUCN 2.3)

- Presumed Extinct (NatureServe)

Scientific classification
- Kingdom: Animalia
- Phylum: Mollusca
- Class: Gastropoda
- Subclass: Caenogastropoda
- Order: incertae sedis
- Family: Pleuroceridae
- Genus: Athearnia
- Species: †A. crassa

Binomial name
- †Athearnia crassa (Haldeman, 1841)

Synonyms
- Anculosa anthonyi Redfield, 1854 (junior synonym); Anculosa crassa Haldeman, 1842 (original combination); Anculosa turbinata I. Lea, 1861 (junior synonym); Eurycaelon crassa Hinkley, 1906 (original combination); Leptoxis crassa (Haldeman, 1842); Leptoxis pisum Haldeman, 1847 (junior synonym)

= Athearnia crassa =

Species of gastropod

Athearnia crassa, the boulder snail, was a species of freshwater snail in the family Pleuroceridae.

== Description ==
(Original description) The shell is either conical or globose in shape and possesses a ponderous structure. It consists of five whorls, which are either flat or slightly convex. The spire is notably exserted, and the aperture is ovate, featuring a well-marked columellar notch. The outer lip is thick, and the overall color of the shell is brown.

The specimen typically reaches a length of 3 inches (76.2 mm) and its habitat is the Clinch River in Tennessee. This species differs from Anculosa praerosa (Say, 1821) (synonym of Leptoxis praerosa (Say, 1821) by its more highly developed spire and its more distinct notch.

== Distribution ==
It was native to the United States, where it was known from Alabama, Georgia, Tennessee, and Virginia. It is now extinct.
