= Fayetteville, New York =

Village in New York, United States

- Village
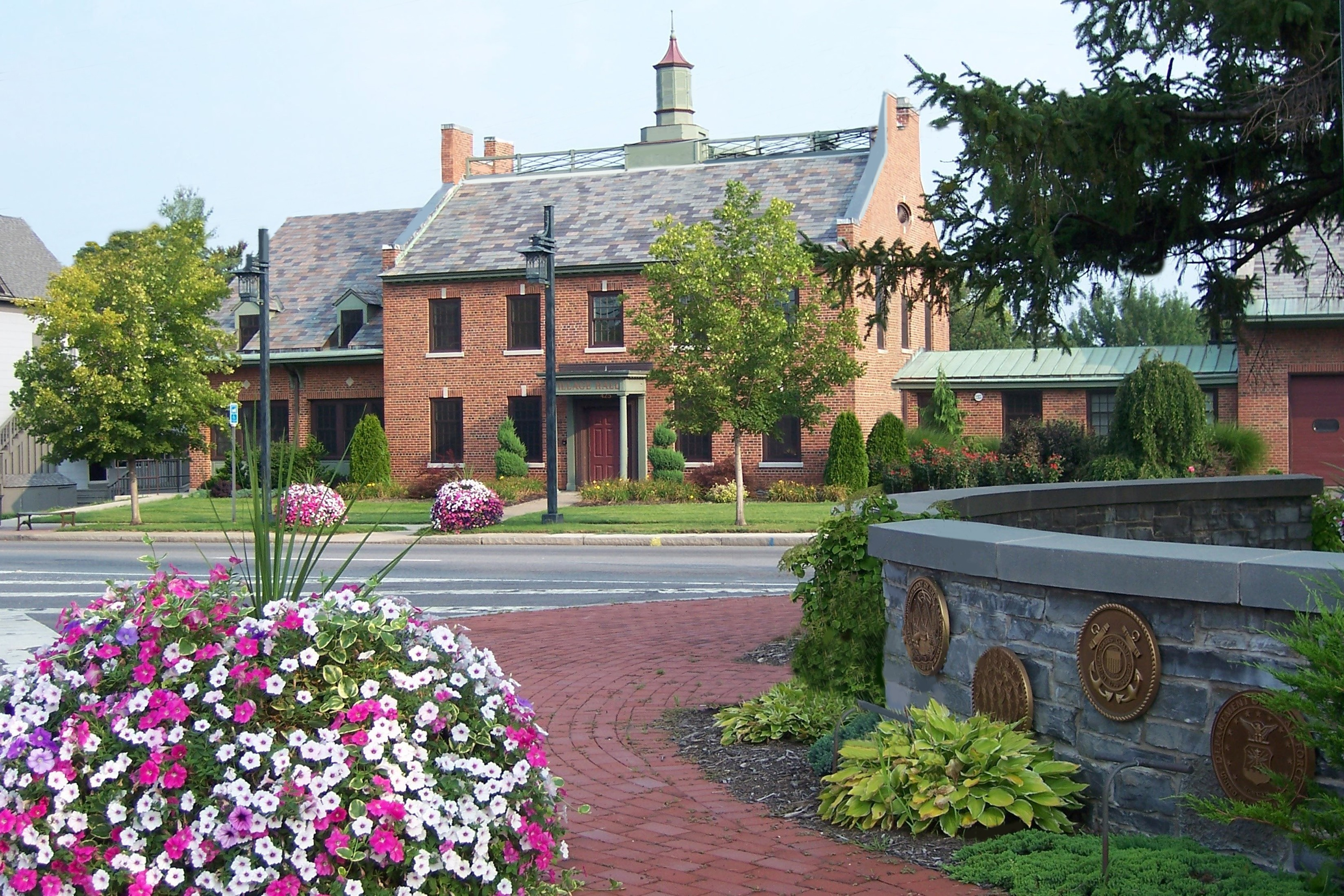
- Fayetteville Village Hall

- Emblem

- Location in Onondaga County and the state of New York.
- Coordinates: 43°1′43″N 76°0′15″W
- Country: United States
- State: New York
- County: Onondaga

Area
  - Total: 1.73 sq mi (4.49 km^{2})
  - Land: 1.73 sq mi (4.49 km^{2})
  - Water: 0 sq mi (0.00 km^{2})
- Elevation: 535 ft (163 m)

Population (2020)
  - Total: 4,225
  - Density: 2,435.8/sq mi (940.48/km^{2})
- Time zone: UTC-5 (Eastern (EST))
  - Summer (DST): UTC-4 (EDT)
- ZIP code: 13066
- Area code: 315
- FIPS code: 36-25527
- GNIS feature ID: 0949943
- Website: fayettevilleny.gov

Fayetteville is a village located in Onondaga County, New York, United States. As of the 2020 census, Fayetteville had a population of 4,225. The village is named after the Marquis de Lafayette, a national hero of both France and the United States. It is part of the Syracuse metropolitan area.

Fayetteville is located in the town of Manlius and is an eastern suburb of Syracuse.

== History ==
Fayetteville was first settled in 1792, later officially incorporated in 1844.

The Charles Estabrook Mansion, Genesee Street Hill-Limestone Plaza Historic District, and Levi Snell House are listed on the National Register of Historic Places.

In 1900, brothers Leopold Stickley and John George Stickley founded L. & J.G. Stickley in Fayetteville, purchasing the Collin, Sisson and Pratt furniture factory. The company operated in Fayetteville for 85 years before relocating to nearby Manlius in 1985.

== Geography ==
Fayetteville is in Central New York, at the intersection of New York State Route 5 and Route 257, at 43°1′43″N 76°0′15″W (43.028516, -76.004268).

According to the United States Census Bureau, the village has a total area of 1.7 square miles (4.4 km^{2}), all land.

== Demographics ==
Historical population
Census	Pop.	Note	%±
1860	1,281		—
1870	1,402		9.4%
1880	1,556		11.0%
1890	1,410		−9.4%
1900	1,304		−7.5%
1910	1,481		13.6%
1920	1,584		7.0%
1930	2,008		26.8%
1940	2,172		8.2%
1950	2,624		20.8%
1960	4,311		64.3%
1970	4,996		15.9%
1980	4,709		−5.7%
1990	4,248		−9.8%
2000	4,190		−1.4%
2010	4,373		4.4%
2020	4,225		−3.4%
U.S. Decennial Census

=== 2020 census ===
As of the 2020 census, Fayetteville had a population of 4,225. The median age was 46.8 years. 20.4% of residents were under the age of 18 and 22.7% of residents were 65 years of age or older. For every 100 females there were 91.2 males, and for every 100 females age 18 and over there were 88.7 males age 18 and over.

100.0% of residents lived in urban areas, while 0.0% lived in rural areas.

There were 1,908 households in Fayetteville, of which 26.5% had children under the age of 18 living in them. Of all households, 45.8% were married-couple households, 17.2% were households with a male householder and no spouse or partner present, and 30.6% were households with a female householder and no spouse or partner present. About 34.3% of all households were made up of individuals and 16.9% had someone living alone who was 65 years of age or older. There were 1,255 families living in the village.

There were 2,043 housing units, of which 6.6% were vacant. The homeowner vacancy rate was 1.8% and the rental vacancy rate was 4.5%.

Racial composition as of the 2020 census
Race	Number	Percent
White	3,763	89.1%
Black or African American	63	1.5%
American Indian and Alaska Native	11	0.3%
Asian	144	3.4%
Native Hawaiian and Other Pacific Islander	0	0.0%
Some other race	32	0.8%
Two or more races	212	5.0%
Hispanic or Latino (of any race)	107	2.5%

== Education ==
Public K–12 education is served by the Fayetteville-Manlius Central School District. Schools situated within the village include Fayetteville Elementary School and Wellwood Middle School. Wellwood Middle School has undergone a major renovation, part of a $45.2 million district capital project approved in December 2017 that includes a 15,000 square foot addition with a new main entrance, cafeteria, music rooms, art rooms, and classrooms as well as adding air conditioning and replacing windows. High school students attend Fayetteville–Manlius High School in Manlius, New York.

In 2009, the Fayetteville Free Library was rated a 5-star public library by Library Journal. The Fayetteville Library provides many useful resources such as quiet areas, computer labs, a teen space, and a makerspace with 3D printers, a CNC router, and a laser cutter.

President Grover Cleveland received his elementary education at the Fayetteville Academy.

== Notable people ==
- Buddy Boeheim, professional basketball player for the Detroit Pistons
- Grover Cleveland, served as the 22nd and 24th president of the United States
- Rose Cleveland, his sister, served as first lady of the United States from 1885 to 1886
- Matilda Joslyn Gage, activist known for her contributions to women's suffrage and abolitionism
- Edward A. Hanna, served as mayor of Utica, New York from 1974 to 1978 and from 1996 to 2000
- Steven Page, musician, singer, songwriter, and record producer; founding member of Barenaked Ladies
- Caroline Pratt, social thinker and progressive educational reformer
- Ashley Twichell, swimmer who competed at the 2020 Summer Olympics

== See also ==
- Limestone Creek
