= Fayetteville-Manlius Central School District =

School district in New York, United States

Location
- Manlius, New York; United States
- Coordinates: 43.007837°N 75.960537°W

District information
- Type: Public Primary and Secondary
- Motto: "Building on Excellence."
- Established: 1951
- Superintendent: Craig Tice
- Budget: $ 74,020,753 (2011–12)

Students and staff
- Enrollment: 4,682 total 1,637 high school 1,476 middle school 1,569 elementary school
- Faculty: 390
- Staff: 378
- Athletic conference: 30 NYSPHSAA Section III varsity teams 2 NYSSRA Section III varsity teams
- District mascot: Hornet
- Colors: Green and White

Other information
- Website: www.fmschools.org

The Fayetteville-Manlius Central School District (F-M) is a K-12 public school district located in the Town of Manlius in Central New York, enrolling approximately 4,800 students. F-M serves a large portion of the Town of Manlius, including the villages of Manlius and Fayetteville, as well as portions of the towns of DeWitt and Pompey. The district is partially funded by and governed under the authority of the New York State Education Department, whose standardized examinations are designed and administered by the Board of Regents of the University of the State of New York.

The district has been recognized statewide and nationally for academic and athletic excellence. In 2015, the Fayetteville–Manlius High School was ranked #79 in the nation in Newsweek's list of "America's Top High Schools". As of 2019, Fayetteville-Manlius Senior High School was ranked #86 within New York State.

== District history ==
=== Establishing the district ===
The F-M School District was established in 1951, when the then independent Fayetteville, Manlius and 11 other smaller districts united. Fayetteville High School and Manlius High School remained separate until 1954, when the Manlius School became the Jr. High (7–8) for the whole district and the Fayetteville school became the Fayetteville-Manlius High School (9–12). The new Fayetteville–Manlius High School was constructed in Manlius and first opened in 1960. The former Fayetteville-Manlius High School was renamed to the current Wellwood Middle School in 1965. Manlius High School became Pleasant Street Elementary, which was closed in 1975, sold and is currently a church and daycare. From the time it was formed until the present, the district has been led by only five superintendents.

=== The Oak Tree and the Hornet ===
The district offices located directly west of the high school, on Route 173.

The oak tree is the symbol of the F-M School District and its heritage. A 200-year-old oak stood in front of what is now Wellwood Middle School, until it fell victim to an unfortunate prank perpetrated by Jamesville-Dewitt students in the 1970s. The characteristics of the tree are reflected in the values, vision, and ambition of Fayetteville-Manlius. The tree is a steadfast, well-grounded, robust, and distinguished entity on the natural landscape. The hornet is the school mascot, and also came from the hornets who nested in the great oak tree. A historical narrative is given by former teacher and assistant principal at F-M High School, Mr. Platt Wheeler:

On the front lawn of what is now Wellwood was a monster, monster oak tree. It has since been taken down. When it was taken down, Ken Phelps, who was then the Principal of Wellwood, had some of the smaller branches cut up into small parts. Ham King, who was the industrial arts teacher, had them finished off with shellac and so forth, and cut up into round pieces and given to various people who had been in the district for awhile and were aware of everything that went by it. As a result of that oak tree, the name of the yearbook was determined to be Oak Leaves. And, at that time when there was only one junior high, the name of the junior high yearbook was called the Acorn...So, out of the oak tree came oak leaves, hornet's nest, the acorns, the alma mater, class rings, etc. These all reflected as a result of the oak tree.

— Platt Wheeler

=== Notable academic achievement ===
- Science Olympiad
  - 2004 National Champions
  - Other National Finishes: 3rd Place, 2005, 4th Place, 2000, 2006 & 2007, 5th Place 2009
  - Ten consecutive first place finishes at New York State Championships (2003–2012).
- 2005 gold medal and 2006 blue ribbon, Expansion Management magazine's Education Quotient
- 1999, 2000, and 2006 GRAMMY Signature School
- National Blue Ribbon School of Excellence Awards (Eagle Hill Middle School, 2011; Enders Road Elementary School, 2014; Mott Road Elementary School, 2020; Fayetteville Elementary School, 2021)
- Six times named one of the American Music Conference's "Best 100 Communities for Music Education in America".
- The district is consistently honored by the Scholastic Art and Writing Awards as having one of the best high school art programs in the country. In 2006, students from F-M High School received a record number of national awards, including the prestigious National American Vision Award.
- The state-of-the art observatory and planetarium are some of the only facilities of their kind on a public high school campus.
- The district consistently exceeds average state and national performances on the SAT. In addition, 99% of F-M students take the exam at least once. The average scores for the Class of 2010 are as follows:

| | F-M | State | Nation |
| Critical Reading | 565 | 484 | 501 |
| Math | 593 | 499 | 516 |
| Writing | 560 | 478 | 492 |
| TOTAL | 1718 | 1461 | 1509 |

=== Notable alumni ===
- Steve Altes (1980), humorist, graphic novelist, and co-recipient of the National Medal of Technology
- Laurie Halse Anderson (1979), New York Times bestselling author and National Book Award finalist for the novel Speak
- Nina Fedoroff (1960), professor of life sciences at Pennsylvania State University; science and technology adviser to U.S. Secretary of State Hillary Clinton
- Sonia Kreitzer (2002), singer-songwriter known as Doe Paoro based in Los Angeles
- Jonathan Murray (1973), television producer and co-creator of MTV's The Real World, Road Rules, and The Challenge
- Tom Rafferty (1972), former professional football player for the Dallas Cowboys
- Chris Wedge (1975), Academy Award-winning filmmaker known for directing Ice Age, Robots, Epic, and Monster Trucks

== Boundary ==
The district is mostly in Onondaga County, where it includes portions of the towns of Manlius, DeWitt, and Pompey. Its boundary includes the villages of Fayetteville and Manlius.

The district extends into Madison County, in sections of the towns of Fenner and Sullivan.

== Demographics ==
As of the 2005–06 school year, there were 4771 students enrolled in the Fayetteville-Manlius Central School District, with an individual grade enrollment low of 301 students in grade three and a high of 421 in grade seven. The racial/ethnic makeup of the student population was 91.0% White, 1.9% Black or African American, 5.6% Asian or Pacific Islander, and 1.3% Hispanic. Approximately 1.2% of the population, or 58 students, demonstrated limited English proficiency. Only 0.9% of the student body qualified for a reduced lunch price, and 2.9% were eligible for a free lunch.

There were 352 teachers employed in the school district, which calculates to a student to teacher ratio of approximately 13.55:1, though it is noted that the average ratio in eighth grade, and tenth grade core classes ranged from 19–25 students per teacher.

== Schools ==
- High School (Grades 9–12):
  - Fayetteville–Manlius High School
    8201 E. Seneca Turnpike
    Manlius, NY 13104
    - Patrick McNamara, Principal
    - Lis Benavides, Assistant Principal
    - Alyssa Haymore, Assistant Principal
    - Elizabeth Wheeler, Assistant Principal
- Middle Schools (Grades 5–8):
  - Eagle Hill Middle School,
    4645 Enders Road
    Manlius, NY 13104
    - Dr. Karen A. Liparulo, Principal
    - Loren Doherty, Assistant Principal
  - Wellwood Middle School (formerly Fayetteville High School),
    700 South Manlius Street
    Fayetteville, NY 13066
    - Trisha Fogarty, Principal
    - Shaena Brasz, Assistant Principal
- Elementary Schools (Grades K–4):
  - Enders Road Elementary School,
    4725 Enders Road
    Manlius, NY 13104
    - Dustin Verga, Principal
    - Tom Cheevers, Assistant Principal
  - Fayetteville Elementary School,
    704 South Manlius Street
    Fayetteville, NY 13066
    - Alexis Thorpe, Principal
  - Mott Road Elementary School,
    7173 Mott Road
    Fayetteville, NY 13066
    - Lisa Geraci-Civaletto, Principal

=== Organization ===
Fayetteville-Manlius' six schools are spread over four separate campuses in the village of Fayetteville and just west of the village of Manlius. Elementary and middle school students attend a particular school based on their residence within the district. Students entering Eagle Hill are typically from Enders Road and a portion of Mott Road, and those entering Wellwood are from Fayetteville Elementary (Fay El) and the majority of Mott Road. Students from both middle schools go on to the high school.

The district offices, varsity athletic facilities, maintenance facilities, planetarium and observatory are located on the High School campus. The transportation department is located on the Fay El/Wellwood Campus

== Administration ==
Dr. Magda C. Parvey has been Superintendent of Schools since March 2, 2026. She replaced Dr. Craig J. Tice, who retired after over 10 years as the F-M superintendent. Dr. Parvey served as the superintendent of the Andover School District in Massachusetts from 2021 to 2026. F-M administrative supporting staff include:

- Brad Corbin, Assistant Superintendent for Business Services
- Kathryn H. Daughton, Assistant Superintendent for Instruction
- Lisa A. Wade, Assistant Superintendent for Personnel
- Amy Evans, Assistant Superintendent for Special Services

== Board of education ==
Fayetteville-Manlius Board of Education members are elected by popular vote, and serve three-year terms, beginning on July 1 of the year elected. Current members (with term expiration dates in parentheses) are:

- Sarah Fitzgerald, President (2028)
- Kristen Purcell, Vice President (2029)
- Marissa Joy Mims (2027)
- Jon D. Van Valkenberg (2028)
- Daniel Seidberg (2027)
- Ann Bersani (2027)
- Sarah Rose Pinsky (2028)
- Robert Spencer (2029)
- Elizabeth Mossovitz (2029)

== Athletics ==
The district's 32 varsity teams compete in the Colonial Division of the Onondaga High School League (OHSL), Section III of the New York State Public High School Athletic Association (NYSPHSAA), and Section III of the New York State Scholastic Rowing Association. Many teams also have modified, freshman and junior varsity components.

Fayetteville-Manlius sports teams
| Girls: | Boys: |
| Fall — cheerleading, cross country, field hockey, gymnastics, soccer, swimming, tennis, volleyball | Fall — cross country, football, golf, soccer, volleyball |
| Winter — basketball, bowling, cheerleading, indoor track | Winter — basketball, bowling, ice hockey, indoor track, swimming, wrestling |
| Spring — crew, golf, lacrosse, softball, track | Spring — baseball, crew, lacrosse, tennis, track, polo, handball, cricket |

The boys' tennis team is undefeated for over 20 years, with over 200 consecutive wins. The girls' cross-country team finished first eleven times and runner-up once at the Nike Cross Nationals between 2006-2017. Additionally, the boys' cross-country team finished first once (2014) and runner-up three times (2004, 2010, and 2017) at the same event. The 2020 boys' soccer team finished with a record of 11–0 and was ranked 3rd in the nation by the United Soccer Coaches, but sectional and state playoffs were cancelled due to Covid. A wide variety of teams claim OHSL and NYSPHSAA Section III championships every year, and most teams are honored with NYS Scholar Athlete Awards.

== Alma mater ==
F-M's alma mater is a stoic symbol of the district's heritage. It is most commonly sung as a fight song and is customarily sung at graduation ceremonies. The lyrics are sung to the tune of Aura Lee:

== See also ==
- List of high schools in New York (state)
- List of school districts in New York
