= Levi Snell House =

Historic house in New York, United States

- U.S. National Register of Historic Places
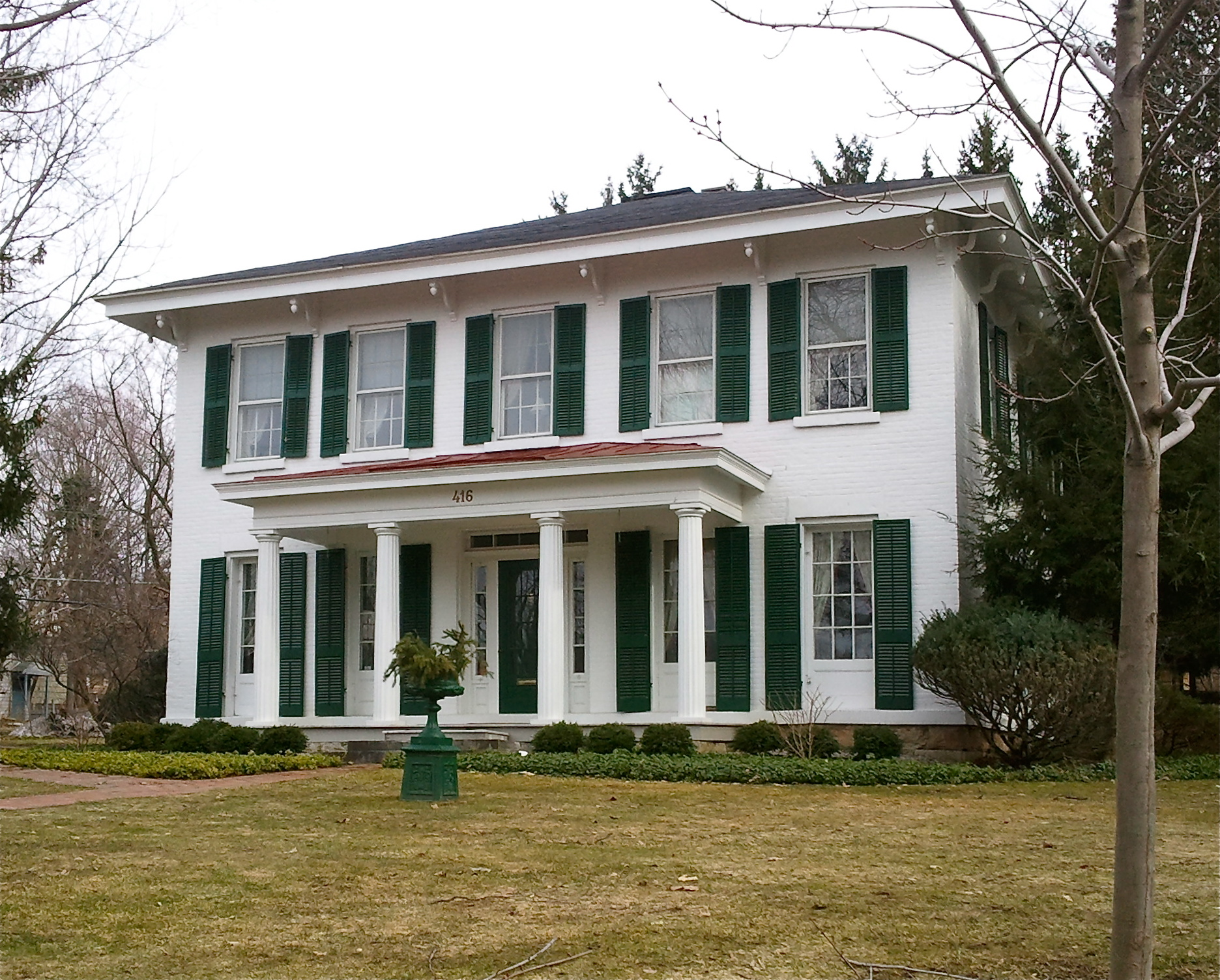

- Location within New York Location within the United States
- Location: 416 Brooklea Dr., Fayetteville, New York
- Coordinates: 43°2′5″N 76°0′30″W
- Area: 0.7 acres (0.28 ha)
- Built: c.1855 and 1946
- Architectural style: Greek Revival, Italianate
- NRHP reference No.: 87001365
- Added to NRHP: August 20, 1987

The Levi Snell House is a house with Greek Revival and Italianate architecture in Fayetteville, New York. It was built in 1855 and was listed on the National Register of Historic Places in 1987.

It's a "substantial, largely intact, mid-nineteenth century brick residence which illustrates the residential designs frequently favored by the prosperous but conservative merchant classes in small upstate New York communities of that period. The house incorporates square massing of the relatively new Italianate style, such as wide eaves and a bracketed cornice, into a traditional five-bay center hall-plan residence with porches, doors and windows treated in the older Greek Revival style."

Its first two owners were Levi Snell and Marquis L. Peck.
