= Bone Creek (Long Pine Creek tributary) =

Stream in Nebraska, U.S.

Bone Creek Tributary to Long Pine Creek
- Location of Bone Creek mouth Bone Creek (Long Pine Creek tributary) (the United States)

Location
- Country: United States
- State: Nebraska
- County: Brown

Physical characteristics
- Source: Calamus River divide
  - location: about 1 mile southeast of School No. 40
  - coordinates: 42°30′32.00″N 099°57′21.45″W
  - elevation: 2,590 ft (790 m)
- Mouth: Long Pine Creek
  - location: about 1.5 miles northwest of Winfield School
  - coordinates: 42°40′57.00″N 099°41′40.43″W
  - elevation: 2,008 ft (612 m)
- Length: 31.92 mi (51.37 km)
- Basin size: 155.46 square miles (402.6 km^{2})
- Discharge
  - location: Long Pine Creek
  - average: 15.31 cu ft/s (0.434 m^{3}/s) at mouth with Long Pine Creek

Basin features
- Progression: Long Pine Creek → Niobrara River → Missouri River → Mississippi River → Gulf of Mexico
- River system: Niobrara
- Tributaries
  - left: Sand Draw
- Bridges: 427th Avenue, 428th Avenue, 877th Road, 429th Avenue, US 20, 430th Avenue, Skillman Pond Road, 879th Road, Meadville Avenue, 880th Avenue, 432nd Avenue, 433rd Avenue, US 183

Bone Creek is a 31.92 mi (51.37 km) long third-order tributary to Long Pine Creek in Brown County, Nebraska.

== Course ==
Bone Creek rises on the divide of the Calamus River in the Nebraska Sandhills about 1 mile southeast of School No. 40 and then flows northeast to join Long Pine Creek about 1.5 miles (2.4 km) north of Winfield School.

== Watershed ==
Bone Creek drains 155.46 square miles (402.6 km^{2}) of area, receives about 22.9 in/year (58 cm/year) of precipitation, and is about 3.38% forested.

== See also ==
- List of rivers of Nebraska
