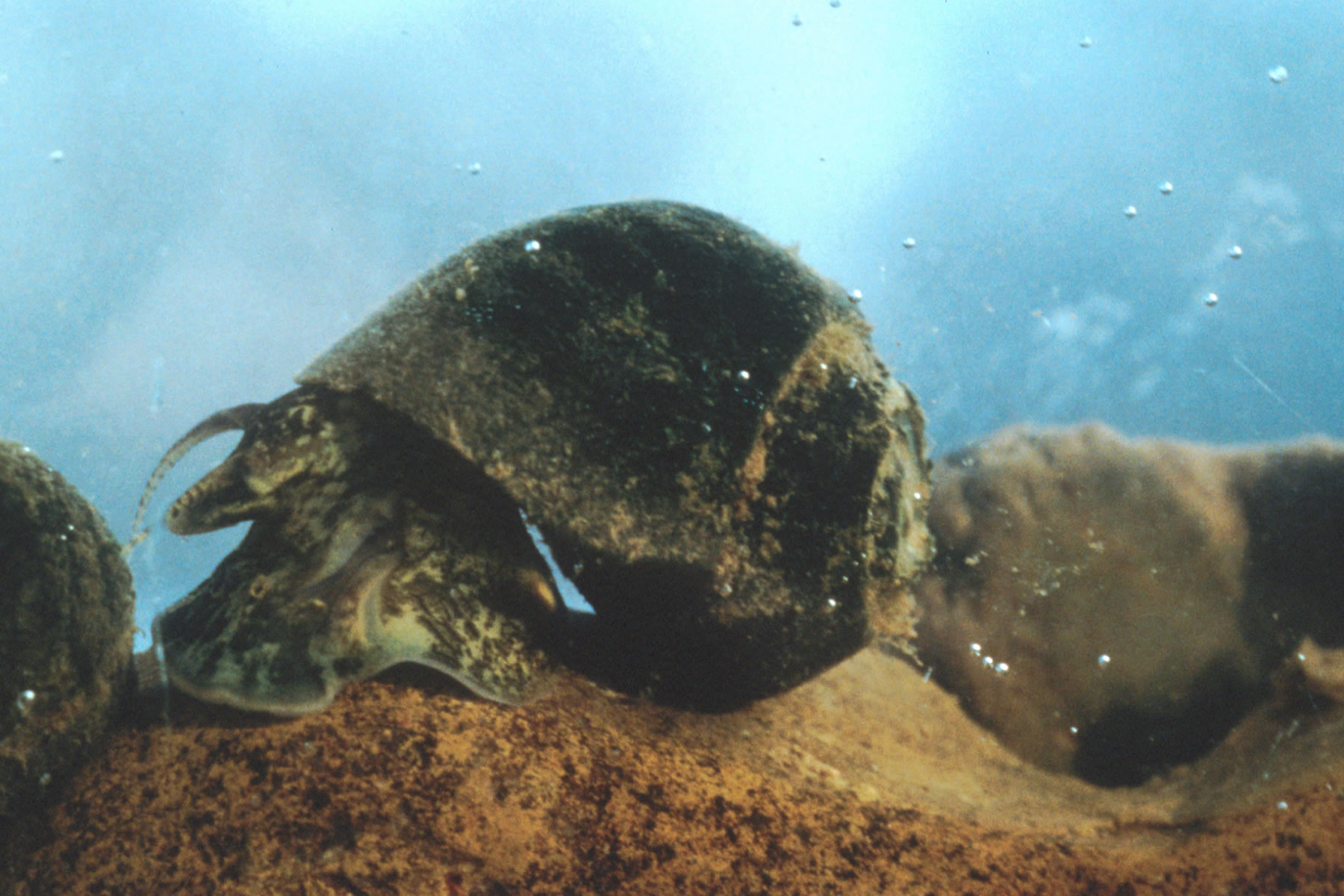
- Athearnia anthonyi

Scientific classification
- Kingdom: Animalia
- Phylum: Mollusca
- Class: Gastropoda
- Subclass: Caenogastropoda
- Order: incertae sedis
- Superfamily: Cerithioidea
- Family: Pleuroceridae
- Genus: Athearnia; J. P. E. Morrison, 1971

Type species
- Anculosa anthonyi Redfield, 1854

= Athearnia =

Genus of gastropods

Athearnia is a genus of freshwater snails with a gill and an operculum, aquatic gastropod mollusks in the family Pleuroceridae.

== Species ==
Species within the genus Athearnia include:

- Athearnia anthonyi (Redfield, 1854)
- Athearnia crassa (Haldeman, 1842), the boulder snail
