= Long Pine Creek =

River in the United States of America

Long Pine Creek Tributary to Niobrara River
- Location of Long Pine Creek mouth Long Pine Creek (the United States)

Location
- Country: United States
- State: Nebraska
- County: Rock; Brown
- City: Long Pine

Physical characteristics
- Source: Calamus River divide
  - location: about 4 miles north-northeast of Hofeld Lake
  - coordinates: 42°27′24.00″N 099°48′5.45″W
  - elevation: 2,547 ft (776 m)
- Mouth: Niobrara River
  - location: about 3 miles west-southwest of Riverview, Nebraska
  - coordinates: 42°43′25.00″N 099°37′41.42″W
  - elevation: 2,008 ft (612 m)
- Length: 37.14 mi (59.77 km)
- Basin size: 437.21 square miles (1,132.4 km^{2})
- Discharge
  - location: Niobrara River
  - average: 179.16 cu ft/s (5.073 m^{3}/s) at mouth with Niobrara River

Basin features
- Progression: Niobrara River → Missouri River → Mississippi River → Gulf of Mexico
- River system: Niobrara
- Tributaries
  - left: Willow Creek; Bone Creek
  - right: Spring Branch; Short Pine Creek
- Bridges: S. Pine Avenue (x2), N Kyner Road, US 20, Bar 25 Road, 889th Road

Long Pine Creek is a 37.14 mi (59.77 km) long fourth-order tributary to the Niobrara River in Rock and Brown Counties, Nebraska. The creek was named from the dense growth of pine trees along its banks.

== Course ==
Long Pine Creek rises on the divide of the Calamus River in the Nebraska Sandhills about 4 miles north-northeast of Hofeld Lake in Brown County and then flows generally north-northeast into Rock County to join the Niobrara River about 3 miles (4.8 km) west-southwest of Riverview, Nebraska.

== Watershed ==
Long Pine Creek drains 437.21 square miles (1,132.4 km^{2}) of area, receives about 23.0 in/year (58 cm/year) of precipitation, and is about 3.96% forested.

== Recreational Area ==
The creek runs through Long Pine state recreational area, a 153-acre tract of land.

== See also ==
- List of rivers of Nebraska
