= Long Pine, Nebraska =

City in Brown County, Nebraska, United States

- City
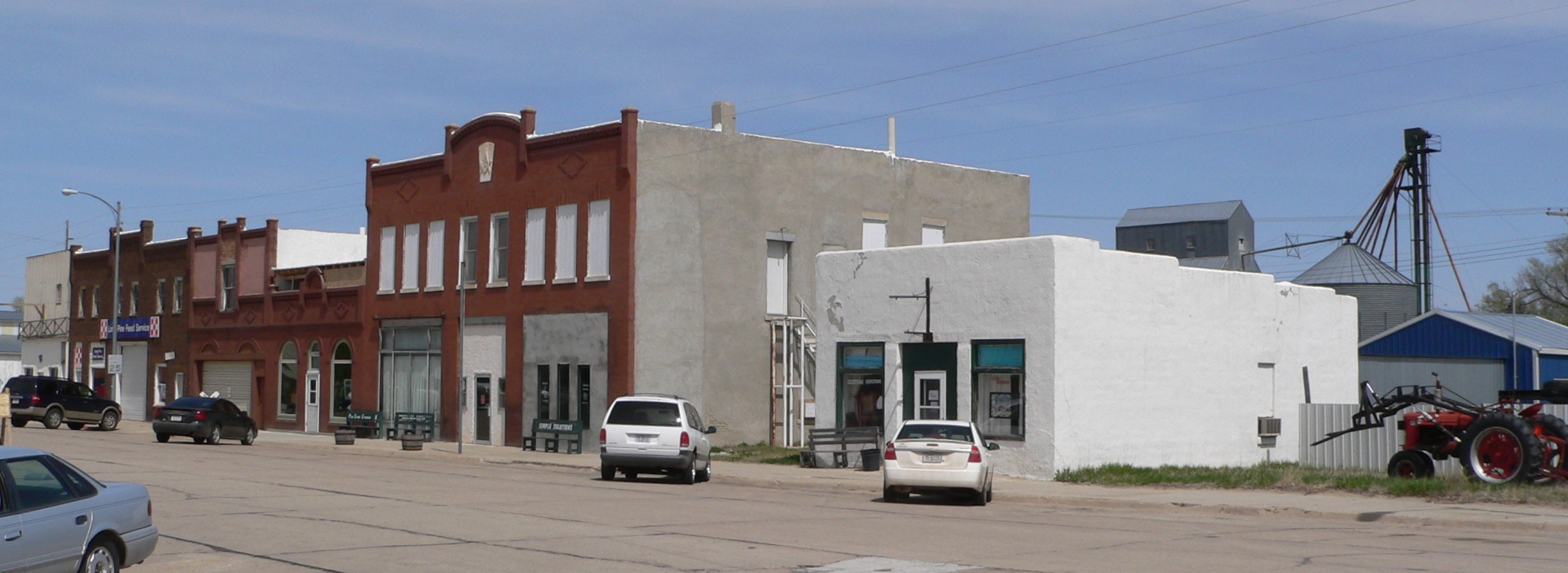
- Downtown Long Pine: east side of Main Street

- Location of Long Pine, Nebraska
- Coordinates: 42°32′07″N 99°42′10″W
- Country: United States
- State: Nebraska
- County: Brown

Area
  - Total: 0.58 sq mi (1.50 km^{2})
  - Land: 0.58 sq mi (1.50 km^{2})
  - Water: 0 sq mi (0.00 km^{2})
- Elevation: 2,402 ft (732 m)

Population (2020)
  - Total: 305
  - Density: 526.4/sq mi (203.26/km^{2})
- Time zone: UTC-6 (Central (CST))
  - Summer (DST): UTC-5 (CDT)
- ZIP code: 69217
- Area code: 402
- FIPS code: 31-29050
- GNIS feature ID: 2395757
- Website: longpinenebraska.com

Long Pine is a city in Brown County, Nebraska, United States. As of the 2020 census, Long Pine had a population of 305.

== History ==
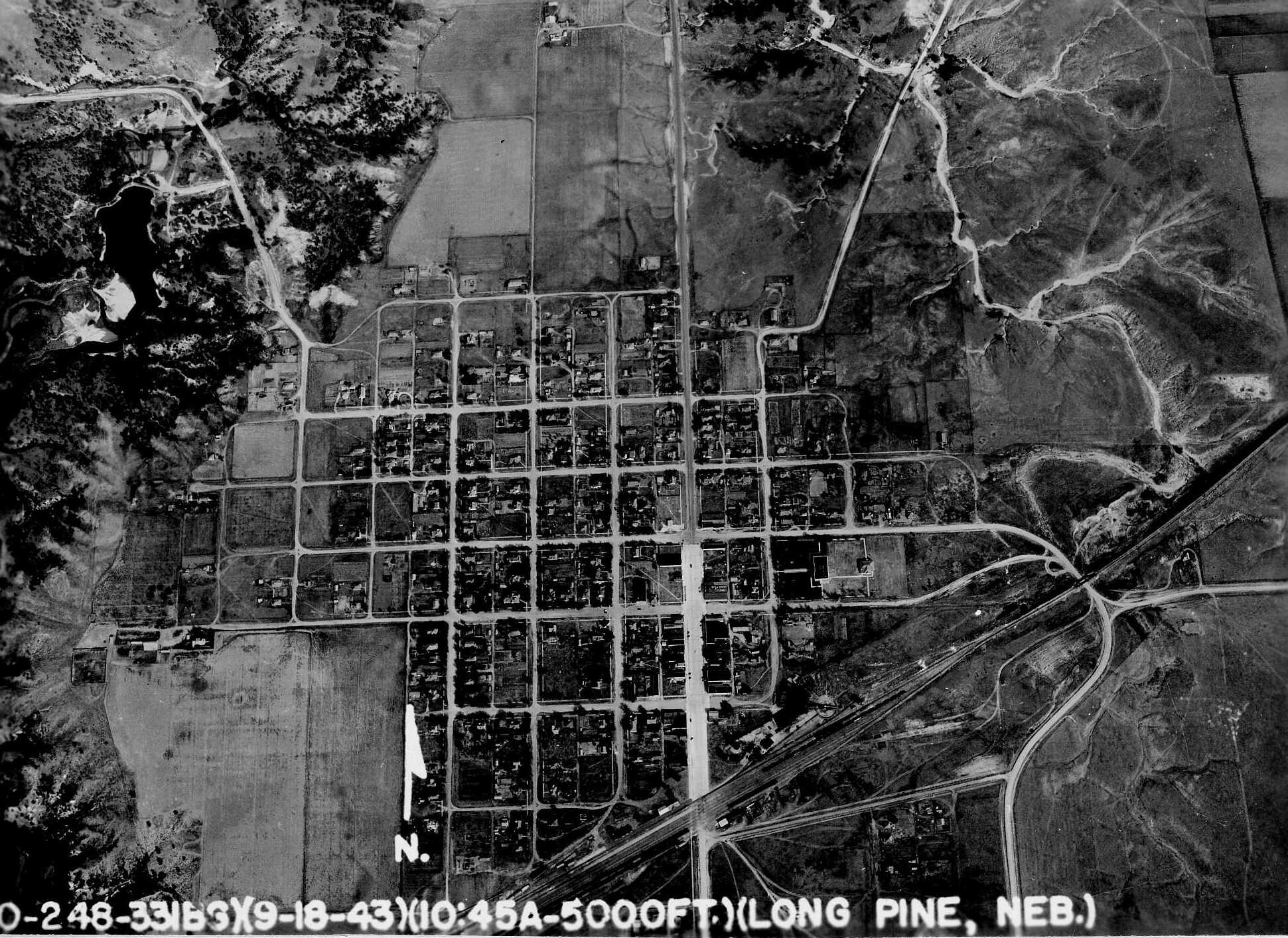
Aerial view of Long Pine, 1943

Long Pine was founded circa 1876, and grew quickly when the railroad was extended to the settlement in 1881. It took its name from nearby Long Pine Creek.

Long Pine was a hub for the Chicago and North Western Transportation Company on what came to be known as the Cowboy Line and at one time held a large roundhouse, turntable, and servicing facility. With the advent of diesel locomotives, the steam servicing facilities were no longer needed and were moved elsewhere. Eventually, the entire line was abandoned and the last train came through the town in 1992. The former right of way has since become a recreational trail known as the Cowboy Trail.

== Geography ==
According to the United States Census Bureau, the city has a total area of 0.58 square miles (1.50 km^{2}), all land.

The city is bisected by Long Pine Creek, Nebraska's longest self-sustaining trout stream.

== Demographics ==
Historical population
Census	Pop.	Note	%±
1890	562		—
1900	486		−13.5%
1910	781		60.7%
1920	1,206		54.4%
1930	937		−22.3%
1940	824		−12.1%
1950	567		−31.2%
1960	487		−14.1%
1970	363		−25.5%
1980	521		43.5%
1990	396		−24.0%
2000	341		−13.9%
2010	305		−10.6%
2020	305		0.0%
U.S. Decennial Census

=== 2010 census ===
At the 2010 census there were 305 people in 145 households, including 82 families, in the city. The population density was 525.9 inhabitants per square mile (203.1/km^{2}). There were 202 housing units at an average density of 348.3 per square mile (134.5/km^{2}). The racial makeup of the city was 100.0% White. Hispanic or Latino of any race were 0.3%.

Of the 145 households 25.5% had children under the age of 18 living with them, 48.3% were married couples living together, 6.2% had a female householder with no husband present, 2.1% had a male householder with no wife present, and 43.4% were non-families. 41.4% of households were one person and 22.1% were one person aged 65 or older. The average household size was 2.10 and the average family size was 2.87.

The median age was 45.6 years. 24.3% of residents were under the age of 18; 3.6% were between the ages of 18 and 24; 21.2% were from 25 to 44; 26.9% were from 45 to 64; and 23.9% were 65 or older. The gender makeup of the city was 47.9% male and 52.1% female.

=== 2000 census ===
At the 2000 census there were 341 people in 154 households, including 95 families, in the city. The population density was 589.8 inhabitants per square mile (227.7/km^{2}). There were 221 housing units at an average density of 382.2 per square mile (147.6/km^{2}). The racial makeup of the city was 99.12% White, 0.29% Asian, and 0.59% from two or more races. Hispanic or Latino of any race were 1.47%.

Of the 154 households 25.3% had children under the age of 18 living with them, 52.6% were married couples living together, 6.5% had a female householder with no husband present, and 37.7% were non-families. 32.5% of households were one person and 16.9% were one person aged 65 or older. The average household size was 2.21 and the average family size was 2.80.

The age distribution was 25.2% under the age of 18, 4.1% from 18 to 24, 23.8% from 25 to 44, 25.8% from 45 to 64, and 21.1% 65 or older. The median age was 43 years. For every 100 females, there were 96.0 males. For every 100 females age 18 and over, there were 91.7 males.

The median household income was $25,156, and the median family income was $26,979. Males had a median income of $25,625 versus $15,972 for females. The per capita income for the city was $12,863. About 13.9% of families and 17.1% of the population were below the poverty line, including 24.5% of those under age 18 and 10.7% of those age 65 or over.

== Notable person ==
- Cliff Clevenger, United States Representative from Ohio from 1939 to 1959; born on a ranch near Long Pine

== See also ==
- List of municipalities in Nebraska
