= Winnie Anderson =

American football player (1909–1952)

No. 24
- Position: End

Personal information
- Born: November 10, 1909; Charleston, West Virginia, U.S.
- Died: November 11, 1952 (aged 43); Columbus, Ohio, U.S.
- Listed height: 6 ft 0 in (1.83 m)
- Listed weight: 185 lb (84 kg)

Career information
- High school: Manlius Military Academy (Dewitt, New York, U.S.)
- College: Colgate

Career history
- New York Giants (1936)

Career NFL statistics
- Receptions: 7
- Receiving yards: 74
- Stats at Pro Football Reference

Winston Donley Anderson (November 10, 1909 – November 11, 1952) was an American professional football player for the New York Giants for one season in 1936. While on the team he wore the football jersey number 24. Born in Charleston, West Virginia, Anderson played college football for the Colgate Raiders. He died of a heart attack in Columbus, Ohio on November 11, 1952.
