= Lunenburgh River =

River in Western Australia

Coordinates: 33°14′05″S 115°54′50″E

Location
- Country: Australia

Physical characteristics
- Source
  - location: Worsley, Western Australia
  - elevation: 187 m (614 ft)
- Mouth
  - location: Brunswick River
  - elevation: 74.8 m (245 ft)
- Length: 16 km (9.9 mi)
- Basin size: 56.3 km^{2} (21.7 sq mi)
- Discharge
  - average: 11.6 GL/a (3.1×10^{9} US gal/a)

Basin features
- Tributaries
  - left: Otho River, Sophia River

The Lunenburgh River is a perennial river in the South West region of Western Australia.

The river rises in the Darling Range near the abandoned timber mill town of Worsley, then flows north-west discharging into the Brunswick River at Beela. The river's catchment of 56.3 square kilometres (22 sq mi) receives a mean annual rainfall of 1,004 millimetres (40 in) with mean annual runoff of 206 millimetres (8 in). Vegetation is 100% jarrah-marri forest (severely affected by dieback disease), of which 15% is cleared. Land use is part state forest reserve, part private timber leases, with a few small mixed farms. The Lunenburgh's two tributaries are the Otho and the Sophia.

The river was named in March 1830 by Lieutenant-Governor James Stirling after Ernest Augustus, Duke of Brunswick and Lüneburg and King of Hanover, the fifth son and eighth child of George III. Over a period of 5 days in December 1813, while in command of HMS Brazen, Captain Stirling had transported the Duke and his entourage to Wijk aan Zee in Holland. In the period since 1813, Prince Ernest Augustus had greatly increased in importance. In 1813 he was fifth in line to the throne. Upon William IV's succession as King in June 1830, he was second in line to the throne after Princess Alexandrina Victoria of Kent. Following exploration of the Brunswick River and its tributaries by boat, Stirling named a number for Prince Ernest Augustus: the Brunswick; the Ernest; the Augustus; the Frederic (after his wife Frederica); the Otho (after Otho I, the first Duke of Brunswick and Lüneburg); and the Sophia and the Matilda (after Prince Ernest's sister Princess Sophia Matilda).
