= Mainstream river snail =

Conservation status
- Vulnerable (IUCN 2.3)

- Secure (NatureServe)

Scientific classification
- Kingdom: Animalia
- Phylum: Mollusca
- Class: Gastropoda
- Subclass: Caenogastropoda
- Order: incertae sedis
- Family: Pleuroceridae
- Genus: Leptoxis
- Species: L. praerosa

Binomial name
- Leptoxis praerosa (Say, 1821)

Synonyms
- List: Anculosa cincinnatiensis (Lea, 1838); Anculosa gibbosa Lea, 1841; Anculosa harpethensis Pilsbry, 1896; Anculosa littorina Haldeman, 1840; Anculosa praerosa (Say, 1821); Anculosa subglobosa (Say, 1825); Anculosa tintinabulum Goodrich, 1940; Anculosa tintinnabulum Lea, 1845; Anculosa tryoni Lewis, 1871; Anculotus angulatus Conrad, 1834; Anculotus praemorsa Woodward, 1856; Leptoxis retusa Haldeman, 1848; Melania angulosa Menke, 1828; Melania cincinnatiensis Lea, 1838; Melania cruentata Menke, 1828; Melania globula Lea, 1841; Melania ovularis Menke, 1828; Melania pilula Lea, 1841; Melania praerosa Say, 1821; Melanopsis neritiformis Deshayes, 1832

Species of gastropod

The mainstream river snail, also known as the onyx rocksnail, scientific name Leptoxis praerosa, is a species of freshwater snail with a gill and an operculum, an aquatic gastropod mollusk in the family Pleuroceridae. This species is endemic to the United States.
