= Limestone Creek =

Location
- Country: United States
- State: Tennessee, Alabama
- Region: Lincoln County, Madison County, Limestone County

Physical characteristics
- Source
  - location: near Taft in Lincoln County, Tennessee, United States
  - coordinates: 35°00′33″N 086°45′38″W
  - elevation: 900 ft (270 m)
- Mouth: Wheeler Lake of the Tennessee River
  - location: near Mooresville in Limestone County, Alabama, United States
  - coordinates: 34°34′41″N 086°53′14″W
  - elevation: 558 ft (170 m)
- Length: 45.5 mi (73.2 km)
- Basin size: 144.3 mi^{2} (374 km^{2})

Limestone Creek is an American river, measuring 45.5 miles (73.2 km) long with a drainage area of 144.3 square miles (374 km^{2}), and is a tributary to the Tennessee River. The river rises in Lincoln County, Tennessee, and flows south into Madison County, Alabama before flowing through Limestone County, Alabama, where most of the river's watershed is located. In fact, Limestone Creek is where Limestone County gets its name. Limestone Creek terminates in the Tennessee River at Arrowhead Landing, which is the southeasternmost point of Limestone County's Wheeler National Wildlife Refuge. The land within this watershed is predominantly agricultural, but has experienced significant recent residential growth from the city of Huntsville.

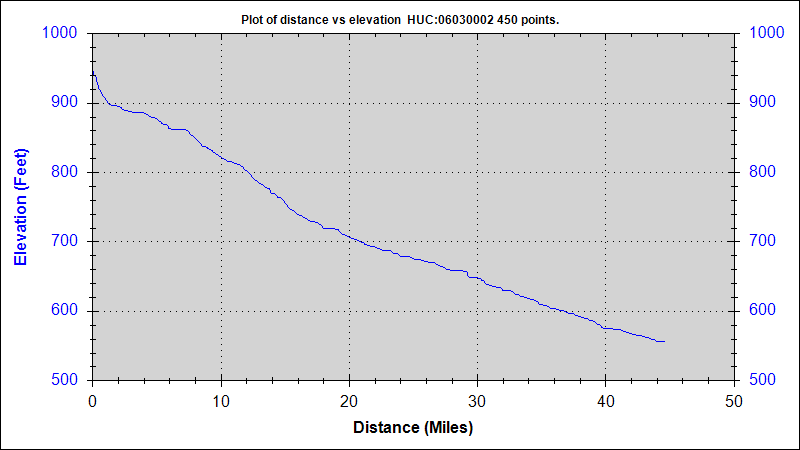
Elevation Profile vs River Length

== Biological diversity ==
Limestone Creek is a host to several species of fish, birds, and mammals. Fish species include Micropterus coosae (redeye bass), Ambloplites rupestris (rock bass), several species of Lepomis (sunfish), Ictalurus punctatus (channel catfish), and Perca flavescens (yellow perch). Sightings of great blue heron are common. Multiple sightings of the American alligator (Alligator mississippiensis) have been reported, especially near the mouth of the river in Limestone Bay, which is the confluence of Limestone Creek with the Tennessee River. There is evidence of beaver presence in the area where Limestone Creek first enters Limestone County and squirrels are abundant near the banks.

== See also ==
- List of rivers of Tennessee
