= Johnstown, Nebraska =

Village in Brown County, Nebraska, United States

- Village
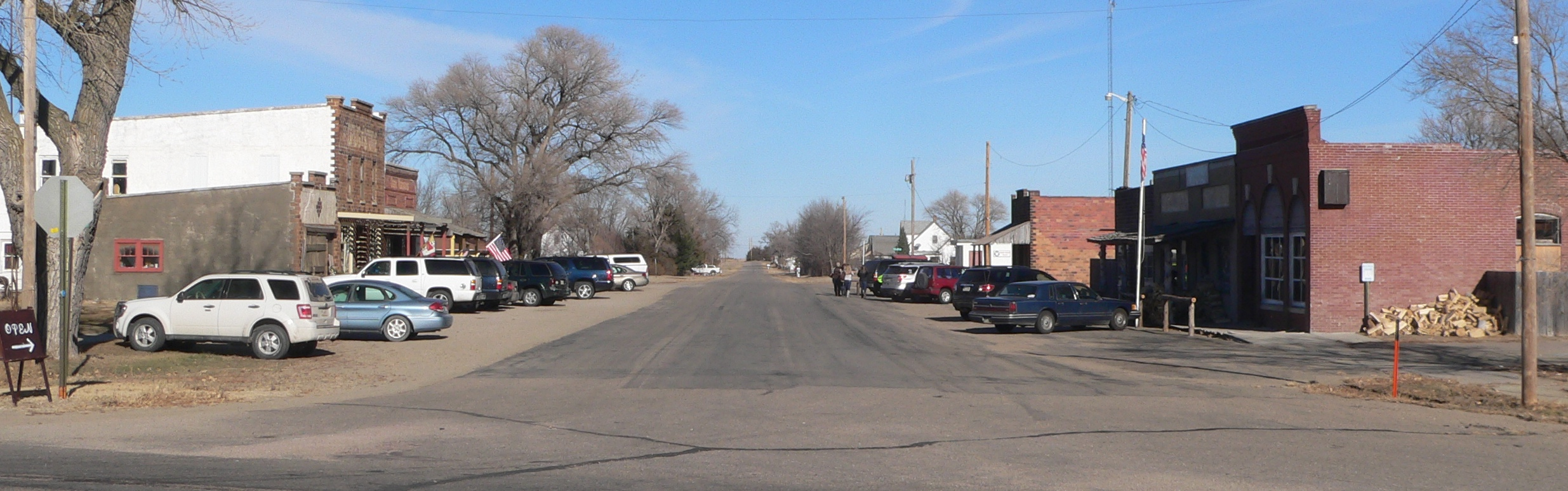
- Main Street, Johnstown

- Location of Johnstown, Nebraska
- Coordinates: 42°34′20″N 100°03′23″W
- Country: United States
- State: Nebraska
- County: Brown

Area
  - Total: 0.53 sq mi (1.38 km^{2})
  - Land: 0.53 sq mi (1.38 km^{2})
  - Water: 0 sq mi (0.00 km^{2})
- Elevation: 2,599 ft (792 m)

Population (2020)
  - Total: 47
  - Density: 88.2/sq mi (34.06/km^{2})
- Time zone: UTC-6 (Central (CST))
  - Summer (DST): UTC-5 (CDT)
- ZIP code: 69214
- Area code: 402
- FIPS code: 31-24740
- GNIS feature ID: 2398308
- Website: www.co.brown.ne.us/johnst.htm

Johnstown is a village in Brown County, Nebraska, United States. As of the 2020 census, Johnstown had a population of 47.

== History ==
Johnstown was platted in 1883 when the Fremont, Elkhorn and Missouri Valley Railroad was extended to that point. It was named for John Berry, an original owner of the town site.

== Geography ==
According to the United States Census Bureau, the village has a total area of 0.53 square miles (1.37 km^{2}), all land.

== Demographics ==
Historical population
Census	Pop.	Note	%±
1920	290		—
1930	229		−21.0%
1940	173		−24.5%
1950	109		−37.0%
1960	81		−25.7%
1970	82		1.2%
1980	78		−4.9%
1990	48		−38.5%
2000	53		10.4%
2010	64		20.8%
2020	47		−26.6%
U.S. Decennial Census

=== 2010 census ===
As of the census of 2010, there were 64 people, 29 households, and 20 families residing in the village. The population density was 120.8 inhabitants per square mile (46.6/km^{2}). There were 38 housing units at an average density of 71.7 per square mile (27.7/km^{2}). The racial makeup of the village was 96.9% White, 1.6% Asian, and 1.6% from two or more races.

There were 29 households, of which 34.5% had children under the age of 18 living with them, 58.6% were married couples living together, 10.3% had a female householder with no husband present, and 31.0% were non-families. 27.6% of all households were made up of individuals, and 10.3% had someone living alone who was 65 years of age or older. The average household size was 2.21 and the average family size was 2.65.

The median age in the village was 45.5 years. 20.3% of residents were under the age of 18; 7.9% were between the ages of 18 and 24; 18.8% were from 25 to 44; 39.1% were from 45 to 64; and 14.1% were 65 years of age or older. The gender makeup of the village was 57.8% male and 42.2% female.

=== 2000 census ===
As of the census of 2000, there were 53 people, 24 households, and 13 families residing in the village. The population density was 100.8 inhabitants per square mile (38.9/km^{2}). There were 35 housing units at an average density of 66.5 per square mile (25.7/km^{2}). The racial makeup of the village was 92.45% White, 1.89% Asian, and 5.66% from two or more races.

There were 24 households, out of which 16.7% had children under the age of 18 living with them, 54.2% were married couples living together, 4.2% had a female householder with no husband present, and 41.7% were non-families. 37.5% of all households were made up of individuals, and 20.8% had someone living alone who was 65 years of age or older. The average household size was 2.21 and the average family size was 2.93.

In the village, the population was spread out, with 18.9% under the age of 18, 9.4% from 18 to 24, 17.0% from 25 to 44, 32.1% from 45 to 64, and 22.6% who were 65 years of age or older. The median age was 47 years. For every 100 females, there were 96.3 males. For every 100 females age 18 and over, there were 95.5 males.

As of 2000 the median income for a household in the village was $20,625, and the median income for a family was $28,750. Males had a median income of $18,750 versus $8,750 for females. The per capita income for the village was $21,380. There were no families and 3.6% of the population living below the poverty line, including no under eighteens and 14.3% of those over 64.

== Notable people ==
- Ralph Luther Criswell, managed local newspaper
- Rita Meyer, Wyoming state auditor

== See also ==
- List of municipalities in Nebraska
