= Brown County, Nebraska =

County in Nebraska, United States

- County
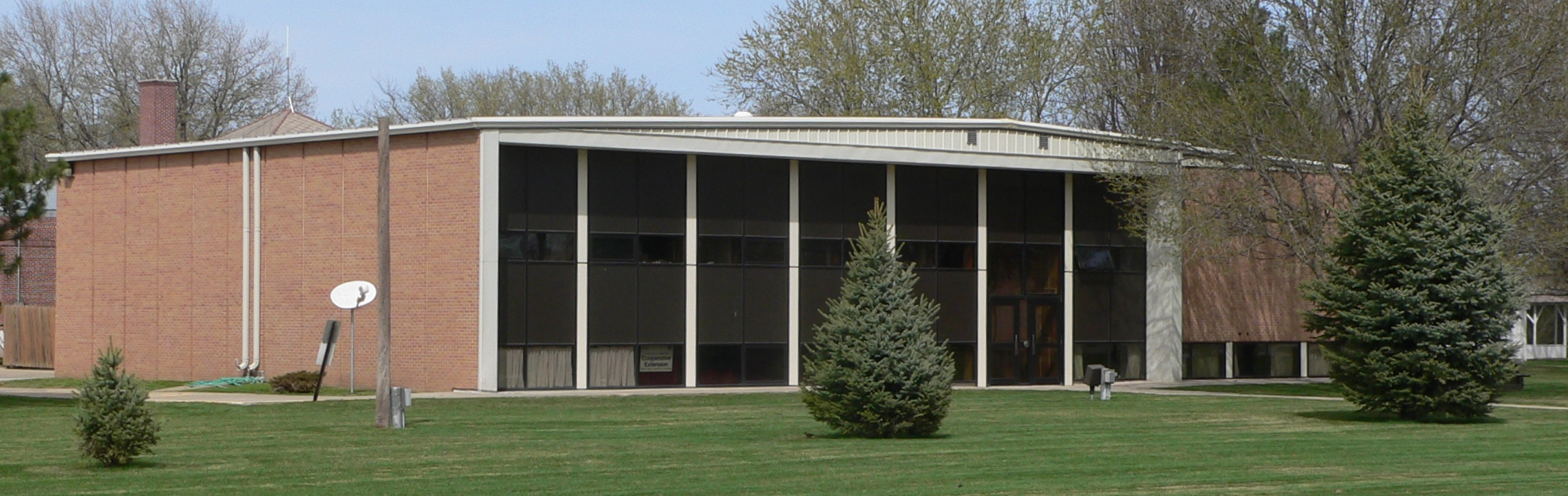
- The Brown County Courthouse in Ainsworth

- Flag

- Location within the U.S. state of Nebraska
- Coordinates: 42.359562°N 99.923920°W
- Country: United States
- State: Nebraska
- Founded: February 19, 1883
- Seat: Ainsworth
- Largest city: Ainsworth

Area
  - Total: 1,225.145 sq mi (3,173.11 km^{2})
  - Land: 1,221.405 sq mi (3,163.42 km^{2})
  - Water: 3.740 sq mi (9.69 km^{2}) 0.31%

Population (2020)
  - Total: 2,903
  - Estimate (2025): 2,826 ▼
  - Density: 2.377/sq mi (0.9177/km^{2})
- Time zone: UTC−6 (Central)
  - Summer (DST): UTC−5 (CDT)
- Area code: 402 and 531
- Congressional district: 3rd
- Website: browncountyne.gov
- • Nebraska county number 09 • Nebraska license plate prefix 75

Brown County is a county in the U.S. state of Nebraska. As of the 2020 census, the population was 2,903, and was estimated to be 2,826 in 2025. The county seat and the largest city is Ainsworth.

In the Nebraska license plate system, Brown County was represented by the prefix "75" (as it had the 75th-largest number of vehicles registered in the state when the license plate system was established in 1922).

== History ==
Brown County was created on February 19, 1883 and named for two members of the legislature who reported the bill for the county's organization.

== Geography ==
According to the United States Census Bureau, the county has a total area of 1,225.145 square miles (3,173.11 km^{2}), of which 1,221.405 square miles (3,163.42 km^{2}) is land and 3.740 square miles (9.69 km^{2}) (0.31%) is water. It is the 10th-largest county in Nebraska by total area.

Brown County is located in Nebraska's Outback region.

=== Major highways ===
- U.S. Highway 20
- U.S. Highway 183
- Nebraska Highway 7

=== Adjacent counties ===
- Keya Paha County - north
- Rock County - east
- Loup County - southeast
- Blaine County - south
- Cherry County - west

=== National protected area ===
- Niobrara National Scenic River (part)

== Demographics ==
Historical population
| Census | Pop. | Note | %± |
|---|---|---|---|
| 1890 | 4,359 | | — |
| 1900 | 3,470 | | −20.4% |
| 1910 | 6,083 | | 75.3% |
| 1920 | 6,749 | | 10.9% |
| 1930 | 5,772 | | −14.5% |
| 1940 | 5,962 | | 3.3% |
| 1950 | 5,164 | | −13.4% |
| 1960 | 4,436 | | −14.1% |
| 1970 | 4,021 | | −9.4% |
| 1980 | 4,377 | | 8.9% |
| 1990 | 3,657 | | −16.4% |
| 2000 | 3,525 | | −3.6% |
| 2010 | 3,145 | | −10.8% |
| 2020 | 2,903 | | −7.7% |
| 2025 (est.) | 2,826 | ▼ | −2.7% |
U.S. Decennial Census; 1790–1960 1900–1990; 1990–2000 2010–2020

=== 2020 census ===
As of the 2020 census, the county had a population of 2,903. The median age was 47.0 years. 20.5% of residents were under the age of 18 and 25.2% of residents were 65 years of age or older. For every 100 females there were 101.5 males, and for every 100 females age 18 and over there were 100.5 males age 18 and over.

The racial makeup of the county was 91.8% White, 0.1% Black or African American, 0.4% American Indian and Alaska Native, 0.3% Asian, 0.0% Native Hawaiian and Pacific Islander, 3.6% from some other race, and 3.9% from two or more races. Hispanic or Latino residents of any race comprised 6.1% of the population.

0.0% of residents lived in urban areas, while 100.0% lived in rural areas.

There were 1,350 households in the county, of which 25.1% had children under the age of 18 living with them and 24.1% had a female householder with no spouse or partner present. About 36.1% of all households were made up of individuals and 18.5% had someone living alone who was 65 years of age or older.

There were 1,642 housing units, of which 17.8% were vacant. Among occupied housing units, 70.0% were owner-occupied and 30.0% were renter-occupied. The homeowner vacancy rate was 1.9% and the rental vacancy rate was 8.6%.

=== 2000 census ===
As of the 2000 census, there were 3,525 people, 1,530 households, and 996 families residing in the county. The population density was 2.89 inhabitants per square mile (1.1/km^{2}). There were 1,916 housing units at an average density of 1.57 per square mile (0.6/km^{2}). The racial makeup of the county was 98.64% White, 0.03% African American, 0.20% Native American, 0.26% Asian, 0.03% Pacific Islander, 0.23% from some other races and 0.62% from two or more races. Hispanic or Latino people of any race were 0.82% of the population. 33.1% were of German and 32.0% Czech ancestry

There were 1,530 households, out of which 26.60% had children under the age of 18 living with them, 57.00% were married couples living together, 5.90% had a female householder with no husband present, and 34.90% were non-families. 31.60% of all households were made up of individuals, and 16.90% had someone living alone who was 65 years of age or older. The average household size was 2.27 and the average family size was 2.86.

The county population contained 24.80% under the age of 18, 5.20% from 18 to 24, 22.80% from 25 to 44, 24.70% from 45 to 64, and 22.50% who were 65 years of age or older. The median age was 43 years. For every 100 females there were 96.50 males. For every 100 females age 18 and over, there were 92.30 males.

The median income for a household in the county was $28,356, and the median income for a family was $35,029. Males had a median income of $23,986 versus $17,135 for females. The per capita income for the county was $15,924. About 8.50% of families and 11.10% of the population were below the poverty line, including 14.70% of those under age 18 and 6.80% of those age 65 or over.

== Politics ==
The voters of Brown County have been solidly Republican since its founding. As of 2024, only once has the county voted for the Democratic Party candidate in a national election since 1916.

| Political Party | Number of registered voters (March 1, 2026) | Percent |
|---|---|---|
| Republican | 1,705 | 83.33% |
| Independent | 189 | 9.24% |
| Democratic | 132 | 6.45% |
| Legal Marijuana Now | 11 | 0.54% |
| Libertarian | 9 | 0.44% |
| Total | 2,046 | 100.00% |

United States presidential election results for Brown County, Nebraska
| Year | Republican | | Democratic | | Third party(ies) | |
| Year | No. | % | No. | % | No. | % |
|---|---|---|---|---|---|---|
| 1900 | 470 | 57.39% | 327 | 39.93% | 22 | 2.69% |
| 1904 | 587 | 70.81% | 134 | 16.16% | 108 | 13.03% |
| 1908 | 588 | 50.21% | 526 | 44.92% | 57 | 4.87% |
| 1912 | 295 | 22.64% | 483 | 37.07% | 525 | 40.29% |
| 1916 | 528 | 35.11% | 901 | 59.91% | 75 | 4.99% |
| 1920 | 1,417 | 68.62% | 558 | 27.02% | 90 | 4.36% |
| 1924 | 1,104 | 45.02% | 714 | 29.12% | 634 | 25.86% |
| 1928 | 1,907 | 74.06% | 636 | 24.70% | 32 | 1.24% |
| 1932 | 1,174 | 42.69% | 1,565 | 56.91% | 11 | 0.40% |
| 1936 | 1,419 | 53.79% | 1,188 | 45.03% | 31 | 1.18% |
| 1940 | 1,783 | 64.65% | 975 | 35.35% | 0 | 0.00% |
| 1944 | 1,549 | 67.52% | 745 | 32.48% | 0 | 0.00% |
| 1948 | 1,174 | 62.65% | 700 | 37.35% | 0 | 0.00% |
| 1952 | 1,950 | 78.22% | 543 | 21.78% | 0 | 0.00% |
| 1956 | 1,566 | 74.08% | 548 | 25.92% | 0 | 0.00% |
| 1960 | 1,735 | 77.15% | 514 | 22.85% | 0 | 0.00% |
| 1964 | 1,272 | 58.97% | 885 | 41.03% | 0 | 0.00% |
| 1968 | 1,340 | 71.62% | 369 | 19.72% | 162 | 8.66% |
| 1972 | 1,462 | 81.58% | 330 | 18.42% | 0 | 0.00% |
| 1976 | 1,241 | 67.59% | 557 | 30.34% | 38 | 2.07% |
| 1980 | 1,615 | 77.38% | 341 | 16.34% | 131 | 6.28% |
| 1984 | 1,514 | 82.60% | 312 | 17.02% | 7 | 0.38% |
| 1988 | 1,336 | 74.93% | 435 | 24.40% | 12 | 0.67% |
| 1992 | 999 | 54.12% | 311 | 16.85% | 536 | 29.04% |
| 1996 | 1,105 | 62.57% | 359 | 20.33% | 302 | 17.10% |
| 2000 | 1,375 | 81.65% | 250 | 14.85% | 59 | 3.50% |
| 2004 | 1,426 | 82.29% | 268 | 15.46% | 39 | 2.25% |
| 2008 | 1,208 | 77.09% | 311 | 19.85% | 48 | 3.06% |
| 2012 | 1,302 | 83.73% | 224 | 14.41% | 29 | 1.86% |
| 2016 | 1,385 | 86.73% | 153 | 9.58% | 59 | 3.69% |
| 2020 | 1,470 | 87.29% | 191 | 11.34% | 23 | 1.37% |
| 2024 | 1,428 | 86.65% | 201 | 12.20% | 19 | 1.15% |

== Communities ==
=== Cities ===
- Ainsworth (county seat)
- Long Pine

=== Village ===
- Johnstown

== See also ==
- National Register of Historic Places listings in Brown County, Nebraska
