= Crawford Hill, Nebraska =

Coordinates: 42°35′30″N 103°21′10″W

Crawford Hill is a helper district with an average 1.55% eastbound grade between Crawford, Nebraska, United States, at an elevation of 3,678 feet (1,121 m), and Belmont, Nebraska at 4,499 feet (1,371 m) on the BNSF Railway Butte Subdivision. Crawford Hill climbs the Pine Ridge escarpment—formations of buttes and grassy dense sand hills lined with ponderosa pines. Manned helper engines based in Crawford are used to help 18,000-ton (16,000 tonnes) loaded coal trains from Wyoming's Powder River Basin up the escarpment.

== History ==
In 1888, the Chicago, Burlington and Quincy Railroad began building a line west from Alliance, Nebraska to Edgemont, South Dakota to compete with the Fremont, Elkhorn and Missouri Valley Railroad. The challenge came when conquering the Pine Ridge escarpment. Upon reaching Belmont, engineers determined the only means of success would be constructing the Belmont Tunnel through the east face of the escarpment, with a steep grade and tight curves down into the settlement known as Crawford. In September 1889, the CB&Q succeeded, establishing a small operations base in Crawford, as well as a connection with the Fremont, Elkhorn and Missouri Valley Railroad.

The arrival of the CB&Q and the creation of a junction between the two railroads provided a significant economic boost to the region, particularly the agricultural and ranching industries. The line also became a vital means of transport for the soldiers, horses, and supplies at the United States Army's outpost at Fort Robinson. In 1907, Crawford became a city, and by 1911, it had the seventh-highest business volume in Nebraska. Through the years Crawford saw many businesses come and go, including a brick works, mica mill, pickle factory, and a Nash Finch Company warehouse. Crawford's population peaked at 2,536 in 1910. All of this was supported by and heavily relied on the railroad.

On March 2, 1970, the route became property of Burlington Northern Railroad as the result of a merger that involved four major railroads—Great Northern Railway, Northern Pacific Railway, Spokane, Portland and Seattle Railway and the Chicago, Burlington and Quincy Railroad—as well as a few small jointly owned subsidiaries owned by the four. The newly formed railroad would bring major improvements to the route.

In 1992 Fremont, Elkhorn and Missouri Valley Railroad successor Chicago and North Western determined there was insufficient traffic on their line to continue operations, and abandoned the track, including removing the diamond crossing with Burlington Northern Railroad at Crawford. A portion of the route from Crawford to Chadron would again see life when revived by the regional Dakota, Minnesota and Eastern Railroad, which in April 2010 handed over operations to shortline operators Nebraska Northwestern Railroad and Nebkota Railway. As of 2014, both continued interchange of grain and merchandise by boxcar at Crawford.

== Bringing coal east ==
In the late 1970s, a large low-sulfur coal deposit was discovered in the Niobrara Basin and Powder River Basin near Wright, Wyoming. The Burlington Northern Railroad began building a line south from Edgemont, South Dakota into the newly found coal deposits to provide rail transportation. The coal loads would head east to Chicago and the Atlantic coast via Crawford Hill.

With the success of the Powder River Basin coal traffic, Crawford Hill was nearing capacity and became a choke point. In 1982, Burlington Northern began a major reengineering project of the route to handle the additional traffic. The project included the elimination of the Belmont Tunnel, and the creation of several double-horseshoe curves to ease curve radiuses and reduce the grade. The right of way was also widened, moving millions of tons of earth and whole hill sides in some places, creating huge cuts to allow for a second main track and access road for the length of the climb.

After Burlington Northern merged with Santa Fe in 1996, the resultant BNSF Railway began a second round of improvements, upgrading communications and signaling systems. In 1999, concrete cross ties were installed to help support heavier tonnage and reduce maintenance costs.

== Operations ==
Crawford Hill is oriented nearly north–south. Trains towards Crawford and Edgemont are considered westbound, while those towards Alliance, Nebraska are considered eastbound. Loaded coal trains operate eastbound, while empties travel west. Coal trains vary from 125 to 140 cars and can weigh up to 19,500 tons (17,700 tonnes). Most trains over Crawford Hill operate with 2–3 locomotives at the front and 1–2 DPU remote locomotives on the rear. Even with up to 5 locomotives assigned to a train, the hill is still too steep and requires sets of manned helper locomotives to reach the summit. Helpers are generally placed on trains at Moody Road in Crawford and are removed at the top of the grade at Belmont. Particularly heavy or under-powered trains will sometimes continue with their helpers to Nonphereil.

In recent years, coal loading in the Powder River Basin has reached an all-time high. In 2012, it was discovered that the same shale formations that yielded coal also contained substantial reserves of oil. By the spring of 2013, numerous companies had entered the region of Wyoming to extract the fuel by means of the controversial hydraulic fracturing, or "fracking", method. Much of the oil is loaded into tank cars, some of which are transported east over Crawford Hill. Merchandise trains from Kansas City, Kansas to the Pacific Northwest also use the route, including movements of Boeing 737 and Boeing 787 aircraft fuselages to Boeing's final assembly plant in Seattle, Washington.

Train movements are controlled by the Alliance West Dispatcher in Fort Worth, Texas with a form of Advanced Train Control System known as ARES. Signals are spaced 3 to 5 miles (5 to 8 km) apart on the double track route and allow for bidirectional running. Trains operate on a frequency of 161.10000 MHz (AAR Channel 87).
