= List of reporting marks: N =

Note: Marks ending in U are for container owners; marks ending in X are not common carriers; marks ending in Z are for trailers without flanged wheels. All other marks are of common-carrier railroads.

== N ==
- NABU - Ecst Container Services and Trading, GMBH
- NACR - Nashville and Ashland City Railroad
- NACX - GE Capital Rail Services
- NADU - North American Domestic Container Corporation
- NADX - GE Capital Rail Services
- NADZ - North American Domestic Container Corporation
- NAFX - GE Capital Rail Services
- NAHX - GE Capital Rail Services
- NALU - Norwegian American Lines
- NALX - Nalco Chemical Company; NASA Railroad
- NALZ - Neptune Orient Lines, Ltd.
- NAMX - NAMX Leasing Company
- NAP - Narragansett Pier Railroad
- NAPX - North American Plastics, Inc.
- NAR - Northern Alberta Railway; Canadian National Railway
- NARX - NORCHEM Incorporated
- NASX - NASA Railroad
- NATU - Nasso SA
- NATX - North American Tank Line; North American Car Corp.; General Electric Railcar Services Corp.; General Electric Rail Services Corp.
- NATZ - North American Transportation
- NAUG - Naugatuck Railroad
- NAVE - Navajo Express
- NB - Northampton and Bath Railroad; Conrail
- NBCX - Nebraska Boiler Company
- NBEC - New Brunswick East Coast Railway
- NBER - Nittany and Bald Eagle Railroad
- NBIX - Bombardier Capital Rail, Inc.
- NBNR - Nicolet Badger Northern Railroad
- NBSR - New Brunswick Southern Railway
- NC - CSX Transportation; Seaboard System Railroad; Nashville and Chattanooga Railroad
- NCAN - Incan Superior, Ltd.
- NCAU - Colonial/Atl, Ltd.
- NCAZ - NCA Leasing Company
- NCBU - Northbrook Container Leasing
- NCDU - Burlington Northern and Santa Fe Railway; BNSF Railway
- NCEU - XTRA Intermodal
- NCEX - National Car Systems, Inc.
- NCFX - GE Capital Rail Services
- NCGU - Genstar Corporation
- NCGU - TIP Intermodal Services
- NCHU - TIP Intermodal Services
- NCHX - GE Capital Rail Services
- NCIR - New Castle Industrial Railroad
- NCIU - North American Container System
- NCIX - Nova Chemicals, Inc.
- NCJU - North American Container System
- NCLU - China Ocean Shipping Company
- NCLX - Nova Chemicals, Inc.
- NCOK - North Central Oklahoma Railway
- NCPR - North Carolina Ports Railway Commission
- NCQU - TIP Intermodal Services
- NCRC - Nebraska Central Railroad
- NCRR - North Carolina Railroad
- NCRU - TIP Intermodal Services
- NCRX - GE Capital Rail Services
- NCRY - Northern Central Railway
- NCTC - North County Transit District
- NCTU - Northbrook Container Leasing
- NCTX - GE Capital Rail Services; PLM International, Inc.
- NCUU - TIP Intermodal Services
- NCUX - Newcourt Capital USA
- NCVA - North Carolina and Virginia Railroad
- NCWX - Northwest Container Services, Inc.
- NCYR - Nash County Railroad
- NDCR - NDC Railroad
- NDEM - Ferrocarriles Nacionales de México
- NDM - Ferrocarriles Nacionales de México
- NDMZ - Ferrocarriles Nacionales de México
- NDT - Ferrocarril Nacional de Tehuantepec
- NDYX - Dresser Leasing Corporation; First Union Rail
- NEAX - Nemic Leasing Corporation
- NECR - New England Central Railroad
- NECX - Mid-Am Equipment, Inc.
- NEFX - Northeast Corridor Foundation
- NEGS - New England Southern Railroad
- NEKM - Mid-Michigan Railroad (Northeast Kansas and Missouri Division)
- NELU - New England Express Lines
- NELX - Dresser Leasing Corporation
- NEMX - Ogden Martin Systems of Montgomery
- NENE - Nebraska Northeastern Railway
- NEPU - Neptune Orient Lines, Ltd.
- NERR - Nashville and Eastern Railroad
- NERX - Transportation Management Services, Inc.
- NERZ - GE Capital Corporation
- NETU - Netumar Lines
- NETX - Nemic Leasing Corporation
- NEZP - Nezperce Railroad
- NFD - Norfolk, Franklin and Danville Railway; Norfolk and Western Railway
- NFLZ - Flexi-Van Leasing
- NFPX - Newaygo Forest Products, Ltd.
- NGIX - Northern Grain, Inc.
- NGOU - Scoa, Inc.
- NGTX - Vangas, Inc.; Suburban Propane
- NH - New York, New Haven and Hartford Railroad; CSX Transportation
- NHCR - New Hampshire Central Railroad
- NHN - New Hampshire Northcoast Corporation
- NHRR - New Hope and Ivyland Railroad
- NHVT - New Hampshire and Vermont Railroad
- NHVX - National Railway Historical Society (East Carolina Chapter)
- NIAJ - Niagara Junction Railway; Conrail
- NIAX - Niagara and Western New York Railroad
- NICD - South Shore Line
- NICU - NIC Leasing, Inc.
- NICX - Niles Canyon Railway
- NIFX - GE Capital Rail Services
- NIHX - GE Capital Rail Services
- NIKX - NIK Non-stock Marketing Cooperative
- NIMX - Naporano (railroad division)
- NIRX - GE Capital Rail Services
- NITX - Nitram, Inc.
- NIWX - Northern Illinois and Wisconsin Railway
- NJ - Niagara Junction Railway; Napierville Junction Railway; Canadian Pacific Railway; Delaware and Hudson Railway
- NJCX - New Jersey Rail Carrier, LLC.
- NJDX - GE Capital Rail Services
- NJRC - New Jersey Rail Carrier, LLC.
- NJII - New Jersey, Indiana and Illinois Railroad; Norfolk and Western Railway
- NJSL - New Jersey Seashore Lines; Cape May Seashore Lines
- NJT - Newton Junction Terminal
- NJTR - New Jersey Transit
- NKCR - Nebraska, Kansas and Colorado Railway
- NKP - New York, Chicago and St. Louis Railroad (Nickel Plate Road); Norfolk and Western Railway; Norfolk Southern
- NLAX - National Aeronautics and Space Administration (NASA)
- NLCL - Northern Lands Company Railway, Limited;
- NLG - North Louisiana and Gulf Railroad; Kansas City Southern Railway
- NLIX - NL Industries, Inc.
- NLLX - Northern Line Layers
- NLPX - Perkins Motor Transport
- NLR - Northern Lines Railway
- NLSU - Nautilus Leasing Services, Inc.
- NLSX - National Starch and Chemical Company
- NLSZ - Trans Ocean Chassis Corporation
- NLTX - National Starch and Chemical Company
- NLX - Allied Chemical Canada
- NMCX - National Machinery Company
- NMGR - New Mexico Gateway Railroad
- NMIX - NSC Minerals Inc.
- NMLX - National Metal Corporation, Ltd.
- NMOR - Northern Missouri Railroad
- NMRX - New Mexico Department of Transportation - New Mexico Rail Runner Express
- NMSX - New Mexico Steam Locomotive and Railroad Historical Society
- NN - Nevada Northern Railway; Northern Nevada Railroad
- NNIU - Nautica Line
- NNPU - Nigerian National Petroleum Corporation
- NNSX - Newport News Shipbuilding and Dry Dock Company
- NNW - Nebraska Northwestern Railroad
- NNYX - National New York Central Railroad Museum
- NODM - Mexico North Western
- NOFU - Nodfos
- NOGC - New Orleans and Gulf Coast Railway
- NOKL - Northwestern Oklahoma Railroad
- NOKR - Northwestern Oklahoma Railroad
- NOKZ - First Union Rail
- NOLR - New Orleans Lower Coast Railroad
- NOLU - Neptune Orient Lines
- NOLZ - Neptune Orient Lines
- NOPB - New Orleans Public Belt Railroad
- NORM - Normetal
- NORX - Northern Indiana Public Service Company
- NOSU - Neptune Orient Lines
- NOT - New Orleans Terminal
- NOTM - New Orleans, Texas and Mexico
- NOVX - Novell Polymers
- NOW - Northern Ohio and Western Railway
- NP - Northern Pacific Railway; Burlington Northern Railroad; Burlington Northern and Santa Fe Railway; BNSF Railway
- NPB - Norfolk and Portsmouth Belt Line Railroad
- NPCX - Northern Petrochemical Company; Equistar Chemicals
- NPIX - Chem-Nuclear Systems, LLC
- NPPX - Nebraska Public Power District
- NPR - Northern Plains Railroad
- NPRX - Yakima Interurban Lines Association
- NPSU - Nigel Parks, Ltd.
- NPT - Portland Terminal Railroad (Oregon)
- NPTU - Neptune Leasing, Inc.
- NPTX - Newport Steel Corporation
- NRBX - Merchants Despatch Transportation Corporation; Fruit Growers Express
- NRC - Merchants Despatch Transportation Corporation; National Refrigerator Car line
- NRCU - Nedlloyd Road Cargo
- NRCX - Northern Rail Car Corporation
- NRDX - Nordic Warehouse, Inc.
- NREX - National Railway Equipment Company
- NRHX - National Railway Historical Society
- NRI - Nebkota Railway
- NRIX - National Refrigerants, Inc.
- NRLX - CIT Group/Capital Finance, Inc.; NorRail, Inc.
- NRMX - National Railroad Museum
- NRNY - Northern Railroad (New York)
- NRPX - Northrop Corporation
- NRR - Nobles Rock Railroad
- NRSU - Nippon Riku-un Sangyo Company
- NRTX - Regional Transportation Authority (Tennessee); WeGo Star
- NS - Norfolk Southern Railway (former); Southern Railway; Norfolk Southern Railway
- NSAX - National Steel Corporation
- NSC - National Steel Car, Ltd.
- NSCT - Niagara, St. Catharines and Toronto Railway
- NSCX - National Steel Car Corporation
- NSFZ - Norfolk Southern Railway
- NSHR - North Shore Railroad
- NSL - St. Lawrence and Raquette River Railroad
- NSLU - Norasia Services, Ltd.
- NSLZ - Nestle Transportation Company
- NSPX - Northern States Power Company
- NSPZ - Norfolk Southern Railway
- NSR - Newburgh and South Shore Railroad
- NSRC - North Stratford Railroad
- NSRX - Jack Frost Cane Sugar
- NSS - Newburgh and South Shore Railway
- NSSX - National Salvage and Service Corporation
- NSTX - North Star Steel Company
- NSXZ - Norfolk Southern Railway
- NSZ - Norfolk Southern Railway
- NTIU - Germanischer Lloyd
- NTKX - VAE Nortrak North America, Inc.
- NTLX - Nashtex Leasing
- NTNU - National Container Network, Inc.
- NTR - Natchez Trace Railroad; Mississippi Central Railroad
- NTRX - NTL Transportation Corporation
- NTRY - Nimishillen and Tuscarawas
- NTTX - TTX Company
- NTZR - Natchez Railway
- NUCX - Nucor Steel Crawfordsville (a division of Nucor Corporation)
- NUSU - Neptune Orient Lines
- NVCX - Nevada Cement Company
- NVPX - Nevada Power Company
- NVR - Northern Vermont Railroad
- NVRR - Napa Valley Railroad
- NW - Norfolk and Western Railway; Norfolk Southern
- NWAX - National Wax Company; BP Global Special Products, Inc.
- NWCX - Northwest Container Services, Inc.
- NWGX - Gorhams', Inc.
- NWLX - Nationwide Locomotive Service
- NWP - Northwestern Pacific Railroad; Southern Pacific Railroad; Union Pacific Railroad
- NWR - Nashville and Western Railroad
- NWRX - Niagara and Western Railway; Bergen Passaic Rail
- NWTX - North West Timber, Ltd.
- NWTZ - NW Transport
- NWX - GE Rail Services
- NWZ - Norfolk Southern Railway
- NX - Mathieson Dry Ice
- NXLZ - National Xpress Logistics, Inc.
- NYA - New York and Atlantic Railway
- NYAU - NYK Line
- NYBU - NYK Line
- NYC - New York Central Railroad; Penn Central; CSX Transportation
- NYCH - New York Cross Harbor Railroad
- NYCN - New York Connecting Railroad
- NYCX - CSX Transportation
- NYD - New York Dock Railway
- NYER - New York and Eastern Railway
- NYGL - New York and Greenwood Lake Railway
- NYKU - NYK Line
- NYKZ - NYK Line
- NYLB - New York and Long Branch Railroad; Conrail
- NYLE - New York and Lake Erie Railroad
- NYLU - Japan Line, Ltd.
- NYNJ - New York New Jersey Rail
- NYOG - New York and Ogdensburg Railway
- NYSW - New York, Susquehanna and Western Railway
- NYSX - New York State Electric and Gas Corporation
- NZCU - Shipping Corporation Of New Zealand, Ltd.
- NZSU - Shipping Corporation Of New Zealand, Ltd.
- NZX - National Zinc Company
