= Cowboy Trail =

Long-distance hiking trail in the United States

Coordinates: 42°00′13.3″N 97°25′33.9″W

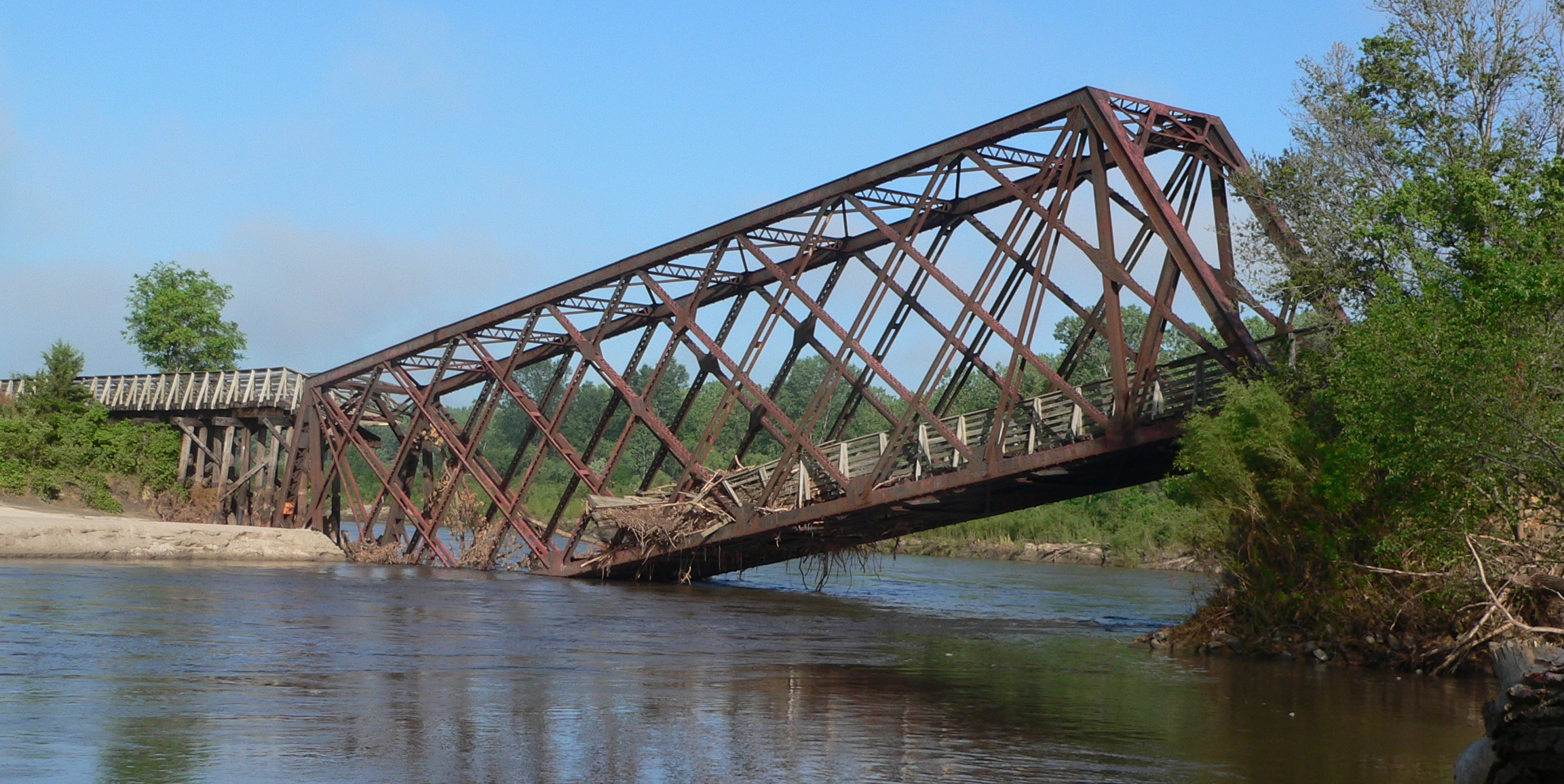
- Flooding in June 2010 collapsed this former railroad bridge carrying the Cowboy Trail across the Elkhorn River near Norfolk.
- Length: 195 miles (314 km)
- Location: northern Nebraska
- Established: 1996
- Designation: National Recreational Trail
- Trailheads: Norfolk, Nebraska; Valentine, Nebraska
- Use: Hiking, Cycling, and Horseback Riding
- Grade: 2% or less
- Surface: finely crushed gravel, short sections have concrete
- Right of way: Chicago and North Western Railway

The Cowboy Trail is a rail trail in northern Nebraska. It is a multi-use recreational trail suitable for bicycling, walking and horseback riding. It occupies an abandoned Chicago and North Western Railway corridor. When complete, the trail will run from Chadron to Norfolk, a length of 321 miles (517 km), making it the longest rails-to-trails conversion in the United States. It is Nebraska's first state recreational trail. The trail runs across the Outback area of Nebraska.

== History ==
Built by the Fremont, Elkhorn and Missouri Valley Railroad (a predecessor company of the Chicago & North Western Railway) in the late 1870s and early 1880s, the "Cowboy Line" was abandoned by the C&NW west of Norfolk in 1992; the section east of Norfolk was abandoned in 1982. Despite extending toward the Powder River Basin coalfield, the C&NW decided that it would be more economical to obtain traffic rights on the Union Pacific Railroad west from Omaha than to upgrade the lightly built line for heavy coal traffic. Only a small section from the 1982 abandonment was saved from Fremont to Hooper. The following year (1993), the Rails-to-Trails Conservancy purchased the railroad's right-of-way for $6.2 million under federal railbanking law and donated it to the state of Nebraska. The Nebraska Game and Parks Commission is responsible for the development and maintenance of the trail.

Development of the trail has occurred at a rate of about 10 to 20 miles (15 to 30 km) each year. In the summer of 2009, the final segment between Valentine and Norfolk was completed, producing a continuous segment of 195 miles (314 km).

A short-line railroad (the Nebkota Railway) did operate on the westernmost 74 miles (119 km) of the Cowboy Trail (from Chadron to Merriman) until 2007. The Cowboy Trail in that section was to be built on an easement parallel to the railroad. In view of the abandonment of the final section, details of where the last section of the Cowboy Trail will be built are still being worked out. The Nebraska Northwestern Railroad still operates trackage between Chadron, including the former CN&W roundhouse and yard, and the junction with the Rapid City, Pierre and Eastern Railroad line at Dakota Junction, just northeast of Crawford.

== Trail guide ==
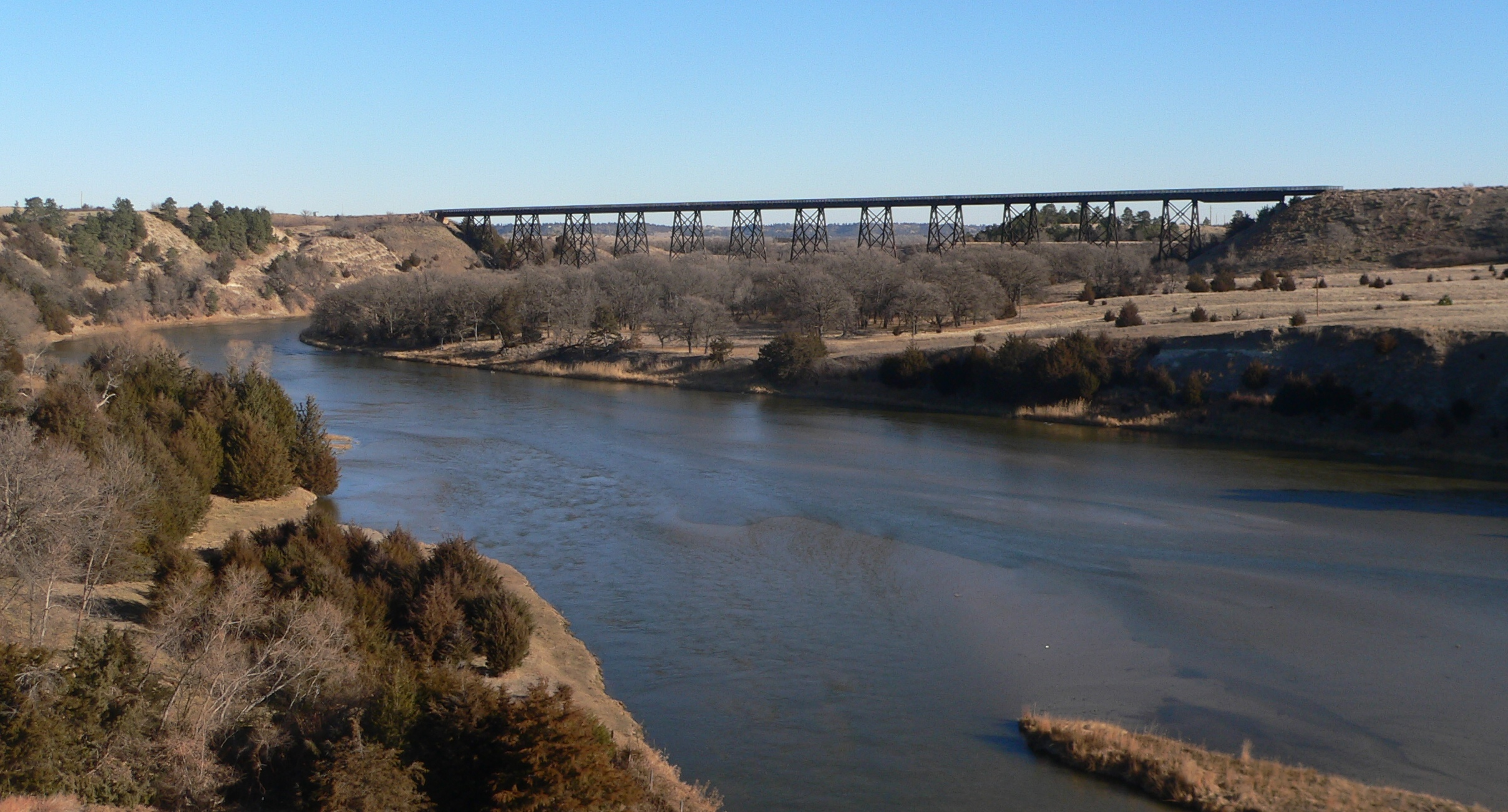
Bridge across Niobrara River southeast of Valentine

There are 29 communities along the length of the Cowboy Trail. Major cities on the trail include (from west to east):

- Chadron
- Gordon
- Valentine
- Ainsworth
- O'Neill
- Neligh
- Norfolk

Trailheads are located in Valentine and Norfolk. Completed sections of the trail are crushed limestone. There are 221 bridges on the trail; all bridges have been converted for recreational use. The bridge across the Niobrara River east of Valentine is a quarter-mile long (400 m) and 148 feet (45 m) high; the bridge across Long Pine Creek at Long Pine is 595 feet (181 m) long and 145 feet (44 m) high.

The trail is paralleled by US 20 and US 275 for almost its entire length. A variety of landscapes are found along the trail: the Pine Ridge, the Sandhills, and the valleys of the Niobrara River, Long Pine Creek and the Elkhorn River.
