= Co-op Block =

Co-op Block may refer to:

- Co-Op Block and J. N. Ireland Bank, a NRHP-listed property in Malad City, Idaho
- Co-operative Block Building, a NRHP-listed property in Crawford, Nebraska
