= United States Post Office (Crawford, Nebraska) =

- US Post Office-Crawford
- U.S. National Register of Historic Places
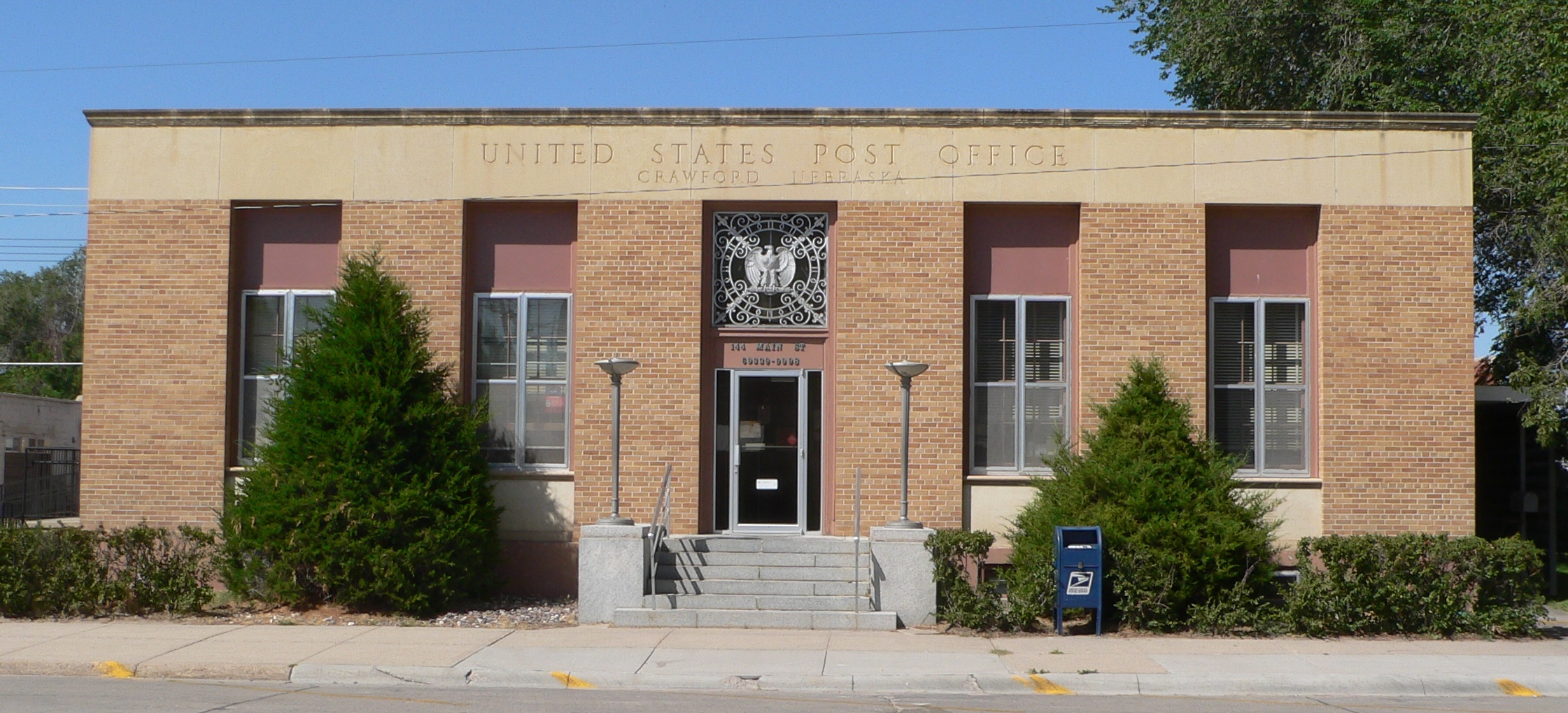
- South elevation, 2010

- Location within Nebraska Location within the United States
- Location: 144 Main Street, Crawford, Nebraska
- Coordinates: 42°41′12″N 103°24′49″W
- Area: less than one acre
- Built: 1938-39
- Built by: Busboom & Rauh
- Architect: Louis Simon
- Architectural style: Moderne
- MPS: Nebraska Post Offices Which Contain Section Artwork MPS
- NRHP reference No.: 92000477
- Added to NRHP: May 11, 1992

The United States Post Office in downtown Crawford, Nebraska is a historic edifice built to house the Crawford branch of the United States Postal Service. It was built in 1938-1939 and was added to the National Register of Historic Places on May 11, 1992, as part of the Nebraska Post Offices Which Contain Section Artwork MPS.

== Description ==
The Crawford US Post Office is located at the northwest corner on 2nd and Main Streets in the commercial district of Crawford, Nebraska. It was built in the Moderne style in the late 1930s from standardized blueprints. Included in the listing are three contributing objects: two ornamental lampposts flanking the staircase to the main entrance and a flagpole. The structure has one story with a basement and measures approximately 60 by 50 feet (18 by 15 m). It is constructed of red brick with a concrete base and topped by a limestone parapet. The main entrance features an aluminum grill with a stylized eagle above the doorway. Two recessed windows with limestone sills are located on each side of the entrance. Although they were originally triple-hung, the upper thirds have been filled in with wooden panels. The architectural features of the front facade are echoed on the remaining sides of the structure. A handicap ramp has been added on the structure's west side, and an enclosed stairwell on the east side provides access to the basement.

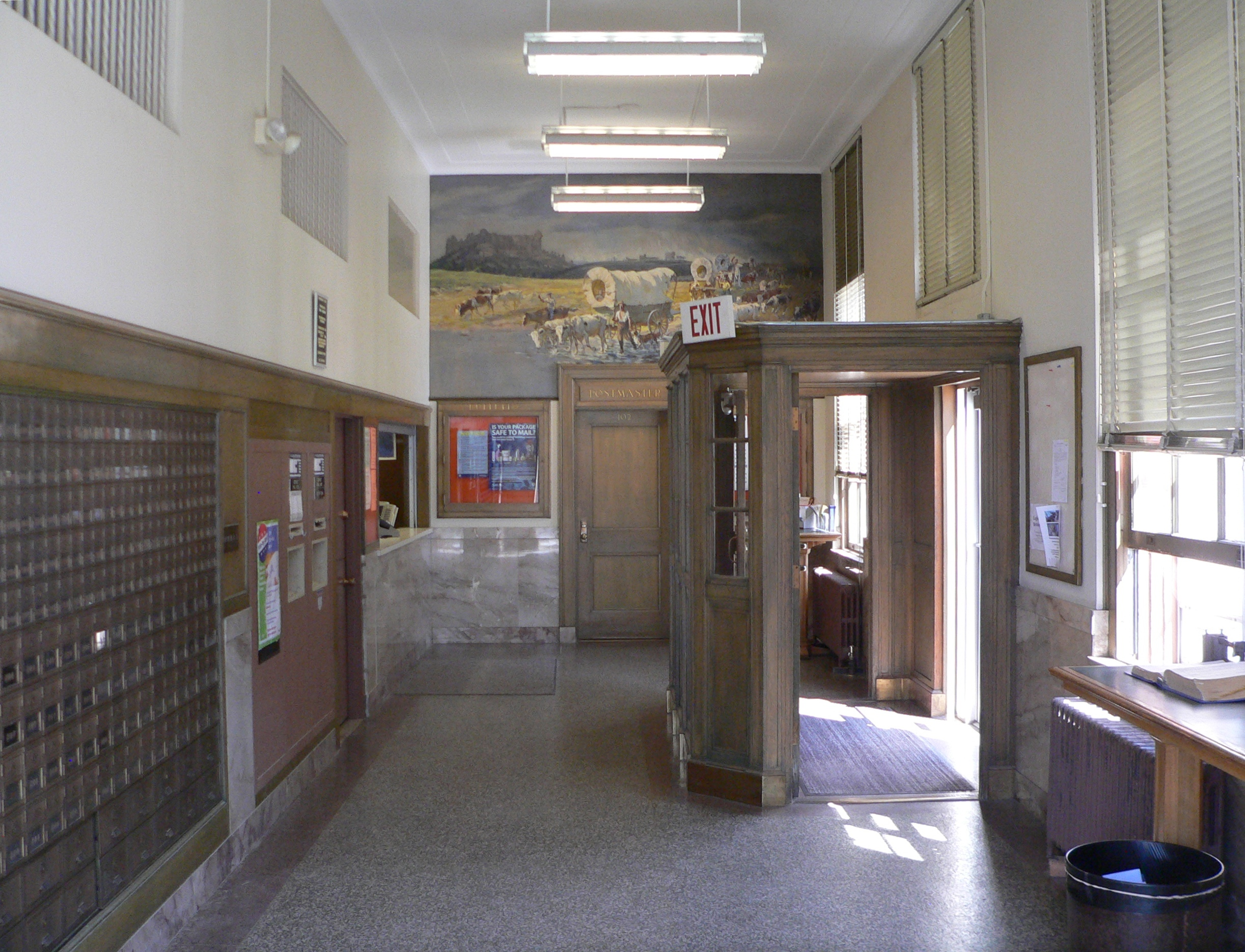
Crawford Post Office lobby, looking east

Inside, the lobby features original marble floors and wainscoting, radiators, and woodwork. The space immediately inside the front entrance is surrounded by a vestibule that projects into the lobby. The building's original light fixtures have been replaced since the original construction, as have the front doors.

The lobby's most prominent feature is a mural on the upper portion of the east wall. It was painted by G. Glenn Newell, an artist and dairy farmer from Dutchess County, New York, and installed by post office workers in May 1940. The piece depicts a wagon train beginning to ford a stream. The lead wagon dominates the scene with other wagons visible in the background, along with local landmark Crow Butte.

== History ==
The first area post office was established in June 1884. It was located four and one-half miles (about seven kilometers) south of what is now Crawford, and was known as the Crow Butte/Sioux County branch. After Dawes County was formed from the western portion of Sioux County, the post office's name and site changed to Crawford. It became a second-class branch on July 1, 1912. City delivery was established on July 1, 1930. After being located in many different locations in town, it moved to the current building, which was built in 1938-1939 and dedicated during the community's 1939 Labor Day celebration.

The edifice's mural, titled "The Crossing" and painted by G. Glenn Newell, was one of hundreds commissioned by the Section of Fine Arts in the late 1930s and early 1940s. Newell received a notice from the section inviting him to submit designs for the Crawford Post Office in August 1939. Newell immediately accepted the commission, for which he would be paid $800. Although he did not visit Crawford before painting the mural, he received several photographs from the Crawford postmaster to aid him in accurately painting the setting. Newell originally conceived the idea of including a poem with the mural, which read, "Seeking the westward sunshine/ Leaving storms behind/ Taking sires of the future with them/ And dams of a better kind." He was informed this was unnecessary. The completed mural was shipped to Crawford in April 1940. It was professionally cleaned and restored in 1981.

The Crawford postmasters have included John Walsh, Cyrus Fairchild, Lee Van Voorhis, C.W. Fritts, George C. Scott, John Pat Davis, John Lemons, Edwin Gorton, Frank Reeves, and Mary Jo Knoell.
