= Belmont Tunnel =

Belmont Tunnel may refer to:

- Belmont Tunnel / Toluca Substation and Yard, a railway tunnel in Los Angeles
- Belmont Tunnel (Nebraska), the only railway tunnel in Nebraska
