= NWCX =

NWCX may refer to:

- Northwest Container Services, Inc. (reporting mark NWCX)
- Northwest Correctional Complex, a state prison in Tennessee, United States
