= Running Water Stage Station Site =

- U.S. National Register of Historic Places
- Nearest city: Marsland, Nebraska
- Area: 2.5 acres (1.0 ha)
- Built: 1874
- NRHP reference No.: 75001089
- Added to NRHP: February 20, 1975

The Running Water Stage Station Site, near Marsland in Box Butte County, Nebraska, is an archeological site that was listed on the National Register of Historic Places in 1975. It is known as, or within, the Hughes Ranch.

It is the site of a waystation on the Sidney Black Hills Stage Road, in operation 1874 to the mid-1880s.
