= Nukem Energy =

German company

Nukem Energy GmbH
- Company type: Subsidiary
- Industry: Nuclear fuel
- Founded: 1 April 1960; 66 years ago as Nuklear-Chemie und -Metallurgie GmbH
- Founder: Degussa; Rio Tinto; Mallinckrodt
- Headquarters: Alzenau, Germany
- Parent: Cameco
- Website: www.nukem.de

Nukem Energy GmbH, with its subsidiary Nukem Inc., markets nuclear fuel products worldwide. Since it was founded in 1960, Nukem has transitioned from a uranium brokerage to one of the world's largest intermediaries in the international nuclear fuel market.

== History ==
Nukem was established in 1960 by Degussa, Rio Tinto and Mallinckrodt. In 1965, RWE acquired 25% of shares.

Effective April 1, 2006, the private equity firm Advent International has taken over Nukem.

In 2007, Nukem sold its subsidiaries NUKEM Ltd. to Freyssinet SAS, NUKEM Corp. to EnergySolutions, NIS Ingenieure and Assistance Nucleaire S.A. to Siempelkamp. On 14 December 2009, Nukem sold its subsidiary Nukem Technologies, which is dealing with nuclear power plant decommissioning, waste management and engineering services, to Russian Atomstroyexport for €23.5 million.

In 2012, Nukem's nuclear fuel products and services trading and brokerage company, Nukem Energy GmbH, was acquired by Cameco.

== Operations ==
The company markets nuclear fuel components to utilities in North and South America, Western Europe and the Far East.

== Transnuklear ==
Transnuklear (TN) GmbH was founded in 1966 as a subsidiary of Nukem and had been responsible for the transportation of nuclear fuel in West Germany until its operating licenses were suspended.

In the 1980s, illegalities occurred in the transport of radioactive waste to and from West Germany and the reprocessing centre (SCK CEN) in Mol, Belgium. SCK CEN employees were bribed by Transnuklear employees to receive higher-level nuclear waste than permitted.

The irregularities came to light after 21 October 1986, when an accident occurred in Kwaadmechelen with a Transnuklear transport from Krümmel Nuclear Power Plant to SCK CEN in Mol. Nuclear waste being transported did not correspond to the documents.

On 8 April 1987, Nukem informed the public prosecutor of Hesse of irregularities by Transnuklear during the 1981-1986 period. Nukem was aware of the illegal activities a month earlier, but waited until after the 5 April 1987 Hessian state election, which gave a narrow majority for Federal Minister for Nuclear Safety Walter Wallmann (CDU).

The bribes concerned millions of Belgian francs for hundreds of transports in nuclear waste. On 10 December 1987, three Transnuklear employees were arrested. The manager of Transnuklear, Hans Holtz, committed suicide in jail a few days later.

On 17 December 1987, German Environment Minister Klaus Töpfer instructs the nuclear authorities of Hesse to rescind the permits of Transnuklear. On 13 January 1988, Töpfer announced an investigation into transportation of nuclear fuel by Nukem/Transnuklear to Pakistan and Libya. This would be a violation of the Non-Proliferation Treaty.

On 21 January 1988, the European Parliament established a committee of inquiry into the nuclear waste scandal. The German Bundestag and the Belgian Chamber of Representatives also established a parliamentary inquiry committee.

Together with the 1986 Chernobyl disaster, this scandal led to the creation of the Bundesamt für Strahlenschutz in Germany and the Federal Agency for Nuclear Control (FANC) in Belgium.
