= MCP Altona =

Container vessel built by Shandong Huangai Shipbuilding Co in 2007

History
- Name: MCP Altona
- Owner: Intership Navigation Co
- Operator: Mini Container Pool
- Port of registry: Liberia
- Builder: Shandong Huangai Shibuilding Co
- Launched: 20 March 2007
- Completed: 24 July 2007
- Identification: IMO number: 9371921; MMSI number: 525025074; Callsign: POGI
- Status: Active

General characteristics
- Tonnage: 5,272 GT; 7,853 DWT
- Length: 117 m
- Beam: 20
- Draft: 6.45 m
- Installed power: (Daihatsu 8DKM-28L) 2,500 kW
- Speed: 15 knots
- Capacity: 629 TEU

The MCP Altona is a 629 TEU container vessel built by Shandong Huangai Shipbuilding Co in 2007.

On December 23, 2010, while en route from the Port of Vancouver, Canada, to Zhanjiang, China, the ship ran into rough weather between Hawaii and Midway Islands, causing some containers of uranium concentrate to open. On January 3, when Cameco became aware of the spill, it ordered the ship to return to Canada; the ship docked off Ladysmith, where the spill was inspected by Cameco, Transport Canada, and Canadian Nuclear Safety Commission. On January 20, the ship docked back in Vancouver to refuel and restock supplies. The ship had 24 sea containers, each containing up to 35 drums, for a total of 840 drums or 350,000 kg of uranium concentrate, on board.
