= Marsland, Nebraska =

Unincorporated community in Nebraska, United States

- Unincorporated community
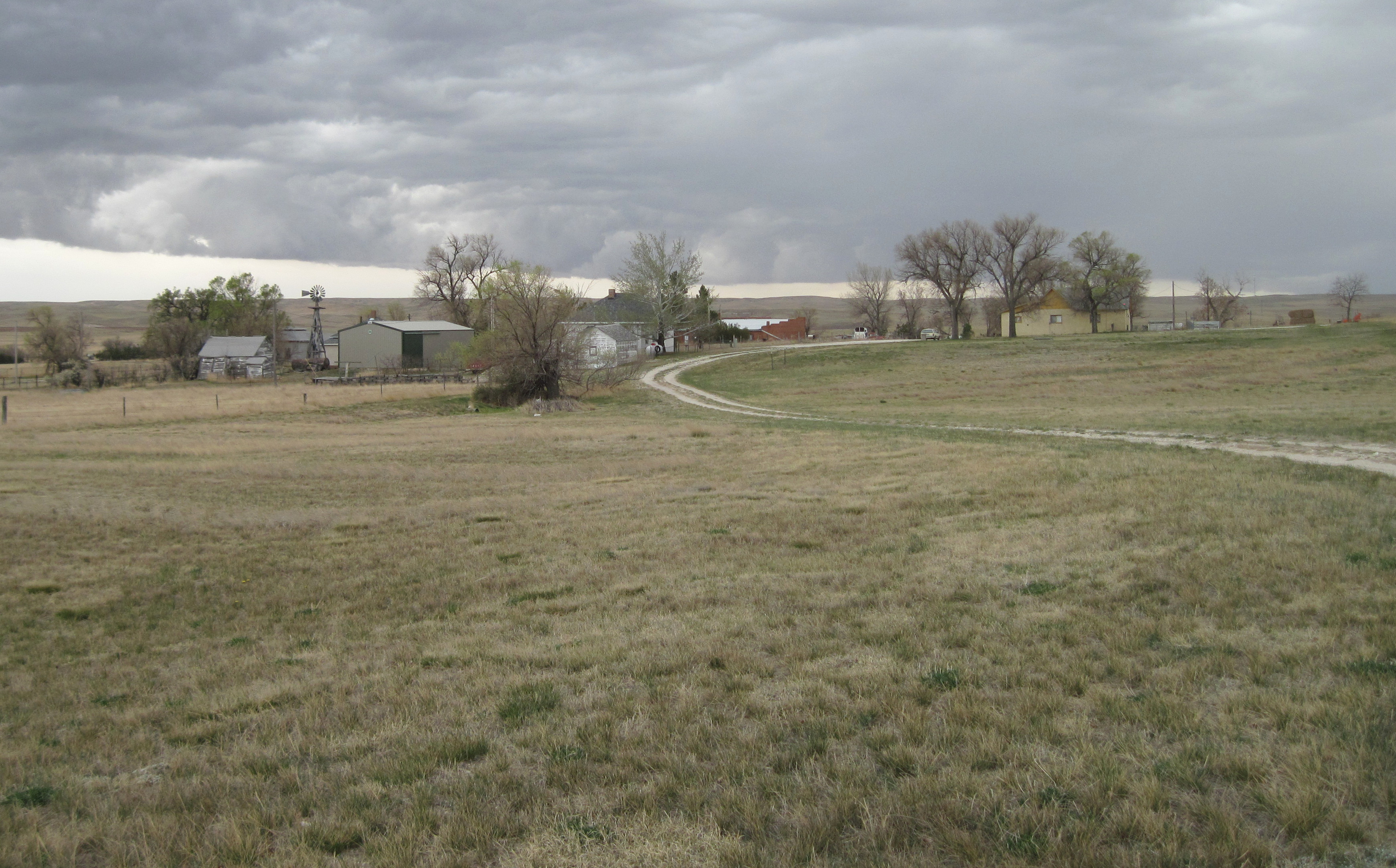
- Overview of Marsland, looking south from the former school, April 2012

- Location within the state of Nebraska
- Coordinates: 42°26′38″N 103°17′55″W
- Country: United States
- State: Nebraska
- County: Dawes
- Established: August 28, 1889
- Elevation: 4,160 ft (1,270 m)
- Time zone: UTC-7 (MST)
  - Summer (DST): UTC-6 (MDT)
- ZIP codes: 69354
- GNIS feature ID: 831064

Marsland is an unincorporated community in southwestern Dawes County, Nebraska, United States. It lies on the Niobrara River along Nebraska Highways 2 and 71, 18 miles south of Crawford, and southwest of the city of Chadron, the county seat of Dawes County. Its elevation is 4,160 feet (1,298 m), and its ZIP code is 69354.

== History ==
Marsland was founded on August 28, 1889. The town was one of many that was located along the Chicago, Burlington, and Quincy Railroad. Aptly, it was named after Thomas Marsland, who was the railroad's general freight manager at the time. The post office at Corbin was moved into Marsland about the same time.

Originally, the town's economy depended upon the construction of the Belmont Tunnel, located some miles north of Marsland near Belmont. The tunnel was finished in 1890, the year that many new businesses were established in Marsland, including a newspaper, grocery store, and blacksmith shop. In 1895 a hotel was built in the downtown district, and the year after, two churches were established. Several economies that kept the community's workforce employed over the years included a flour mill and ice production.

Marsland's population peaked at 200 in 1910. In the years immediately following, a number of fires consumed a large portion of the town's business district. Over the next several decades, many families left because of drought and financial hardships, moving their houses with them. Today, only a minimal number of houses and several commercial building remain. Although it is still occupied by a small number of residents, Marsland is largely considered a ghost town.

== Education ==
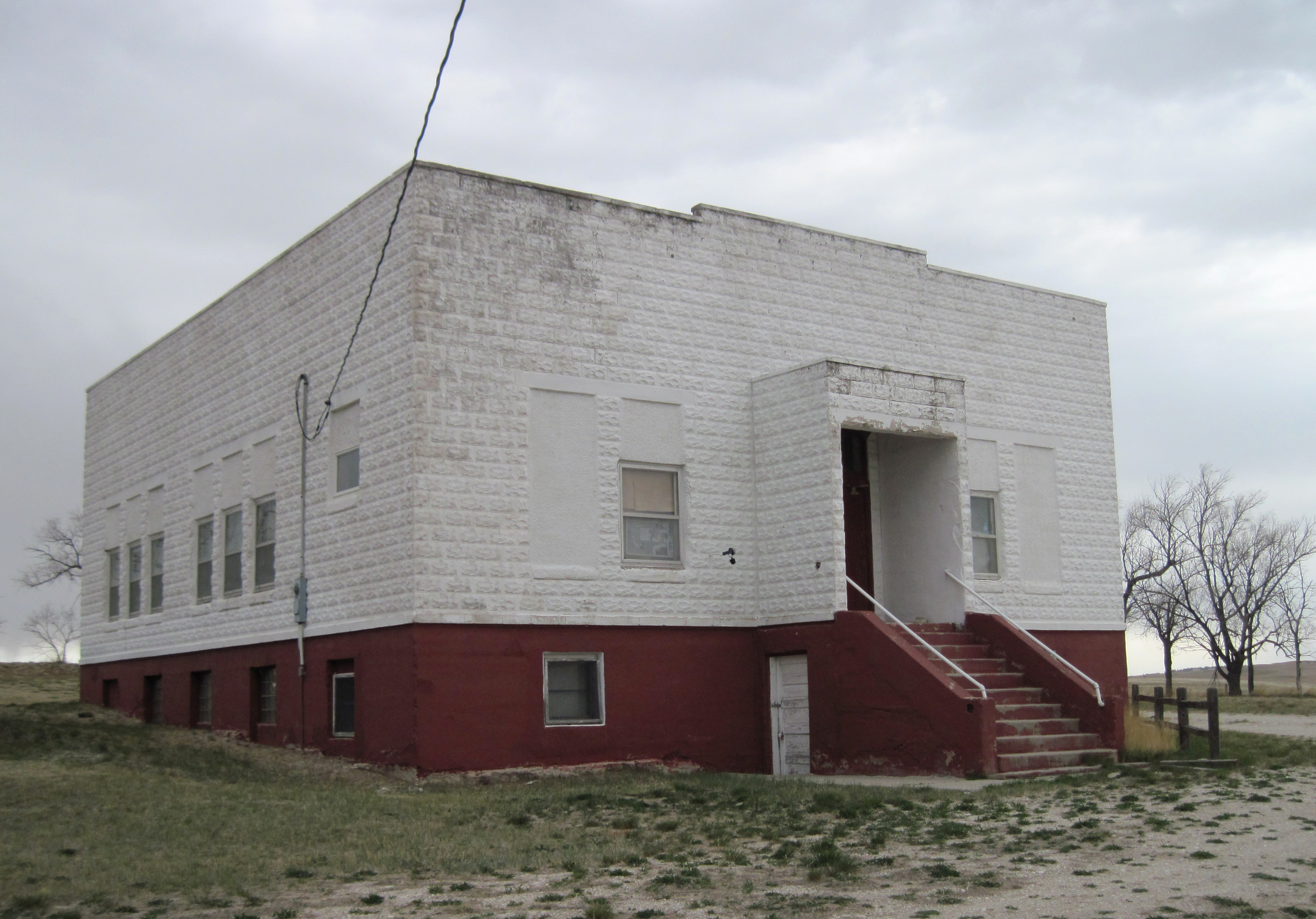
Marsland School, April 2012

The first school in Marsland was built in 1890. A new two-story school with a basement was built in 1915 of brick fabricated by a local Mr. Bell. Both floors had two large rooms separated by a hallway. The school served children in both primary and secondary grades from Marsland and the surrounding rural area. In 1947 the school was condemned, as the building shook whenever the wind blew. Thus, the second story was removed and the remaining structure renovated. The institution stopped offering high school classes in 1951, and the elementary school was closed in 1992, when Marsland's student body was consolidated into the Hemingford school district. The building still stands and is under private ownership.
