= Cameco =

Canada uranium company

Cameco Corporation

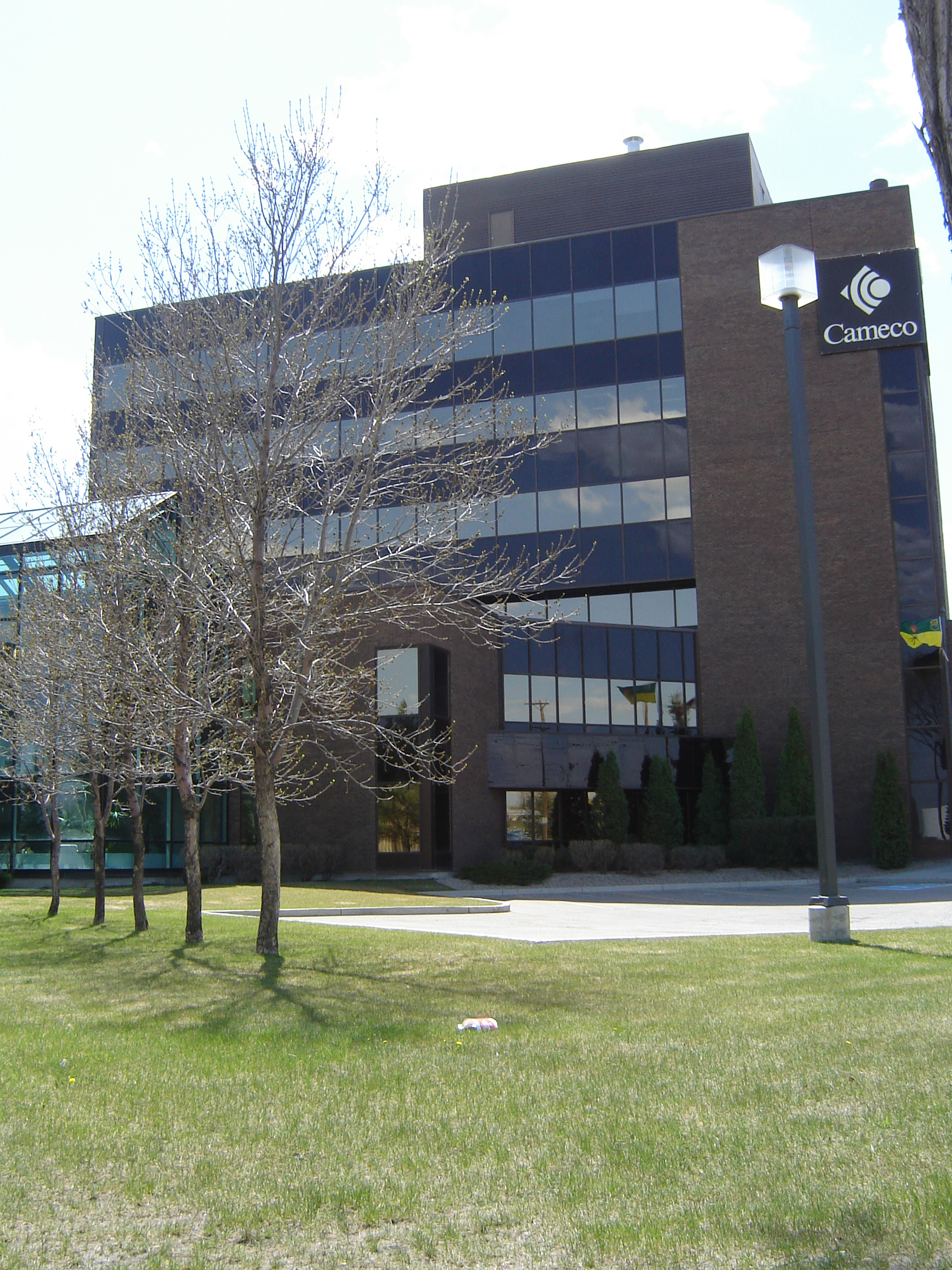
- Head office in Saskatoon, Canada
- Formerly: Canadian Mining and Energy Corporation
- Type: Public
- Traded as: TSX: CCO; NYSE: CCJ; S&P/TSX 60 component
- Industry: Mining, energy
- Predecessors: Eldorado Resources; Saskatchewan Mining Development Corporation
- Founded: 1988; 38 years ago
- Headquarters: Saskatoon, Saskatchewan, Canada
- Key people: Catherine Gignac (Board Chair); Tim Gitzel (Chief Executive Officer)
- Products: Uranium, electricity
- Revenue: ▲CA$3.482 billion (2025)
- Number of employees: 3,082 (2025)
- Website: www.cameco.com

Cameco Corporation (formerly Canadian Mining and Energy Corporation) is the world's largest publicly traded uranium company, based in Saskatoon, Saskatchewan, Canada. In 2015, it was the world's second largest uranium producer, accounting for 18% of world production.

== History ==
The Canadian Mining and Energy Corporation was formed in 1988 by the merger and privatization of two Crown corporations: the federally owned Eldorado Nuclear Limited (known previously as Eldorado Mining and Refining Limited) and Saskatchewan-based Saskatchewan Mining Development Corporation (SMDC). The name was later shortened to "Cameco Corporation".

The new company was initially owned 62% by the provincial government and 38% by the federal government. The initial public offering (IPO) for 20% of the company was conducted in July, 1991. Government ownership of the company decreased over the next eleven years, with full privatization occurring in February, 2002.

In 1996, Cameco acquired Power Resources Inc., the largest uranium producer in the United States. This was followed in 1998 by the acquisition of Canadian-based Uranerz Exploration and Mining Limited and Uranerz U.S.A., Inc.

In 2008, Cameco purchased a 24% stake in Global Laser Enrichment (GLE), the exclusive licensee of the proprietary Separation of Isotopes by Laser Excitation (SILEX) technology developed by SILEX Systems Limited. GLE is developing this third-generation uranium enrichment technology. In 2021, Cameco and SILEX purchased GE-Hitachi's 76% stake in GLE, leaving Cameco with 49% of the company.

In 2011, Cameco signed an agreement with Talvivaara Mining Company whereby Cameco would pay US$60 million to construct a uranium extraction circuit at the Talvivaara nickel-zinc mine in Sotkamo, Finland. Talvivaara would then pay back the initial construction costs in the form of uranium concentrate; once the initial costs were paid Cameco would continue to purchase the uranium concentrate at a pricing formula based on market price on the day of delivery.

In 2012, it acquired a nuclear fuel intermediary, Nukem Energy.

In 2016, Cameco suspended operations at its Rabbit Lake mine, due to low uranium prices. In 2017, it suspended operations for at least 10 months at its McArthur River mine and Key Lake mill, converting that to an indefinite shutdown in 2018 involving the layoff of about 700 staff.

In October 2022, Cameco along with Brookfield Renewable Partners announced the acquisition of Westinghouse Electric Company in a US$7.9 billion deal including debt. Cameco will own a 49% interest in the company as part of the deal. The acquisition was completed in November 2023.

== Operations ==
Cameco operates uranium mines in North America and Kazakhstan, including McArthur River-Key Lake, the world's largest uranium producer, and Cigar Lake, the world's highest grade uranium mine, both in Saskatchewan. Other operations in Saskatchewan include a mine and mill at Rabbit Lake, currently in care and maintenance.

In the United States, Cameco operates uranium mines in the states of Nebraska and Wyoming through its US subsidiary Cameco Resources Inc. Cameco Resources was formed in 2007 through a restructuring of two wholly owned subsidiaries, Power Resources Inc. (Wyoming) and Crow Butte Resources, Inc. (Nebraska).

In the province of Ontario, Cameco operates a uranium refinery in Blind River and a uranium conversion facility in Port Hope, which has faced opposition from some community groups. Cameco is the exclusive fuel supplier to Bruce Power, which supplies 30% of Ontario's electricity through its nuclear generating plant. It used to own part of Bruce Power, but it sold its interest in 2014.

In 2004, Cameco spun off its gold mining operations in Kyrgyzstan, Mongolia and the United States to a newly formed public company, Centerra Gold. Cameco divested its remaining interest in Centerra on December 30, 2009.

In January 2011, Cameco participated in the clean up of a ship-board uranium concentrate spill on the MCP Altona that had occurred on December 23, 2010.

Mines
Producing
Name	Location
Smith Ranch-Highland	Wyoming, United States
Cigar Lake	Saskatchewan, Canada
Crow Butte	Nebraska, United States
Inkai	Kazakhstan
McArthur River	Saskatchewan, Canada
Suspended
Eagle Point (Rabbit Lake)	Saskatchewan, Canada

Mills
Name	Location
Key Lake	Saskatchewan, Canada
Rabbit Lake	Saskatchewan, Canada

Fuel Production
Name	Location
Port Hope conversion facility	Ontario, Canada
Blind River refinery	Ontario, Canada

== Tax Dispute ==
The Canadian Revenue Agency (CRA) claimed Cameco's tax scheme started in 1999. Cameco created a marketing subsidiary in Zug, Switzerland, and drafted a 17-year agreement to supply uranium to the Swiss subsidiary at a rate of $10 a pound. The corporate tax rate in Switzerland is estimated to be at around 10 per cent. The Canadian corporate rate estimated to be at least 27 per cent. By having the Swiss subsidiary purchase the uranium first, and then selling it elsewhere, Cameco was able to pay the Canadian tax rate for the first $10 and the remainder at the Swiss tax rate.

In 2012, the Canadian research firm Veritas Investment Research estimated that Cameco paid $36 million in cash taxes on $680 million pre-tax cash flow from operations, or at a rate of 5 per cent. During the previous six-year period, the Swiss subsidiary claimed $4.3 billion in profits, while its Canadian operation claimed a loss of $1.3 billion. Cameco had also established another subsidiary in Barbados, a known tax haven. The operations conducted in this subsidiary were not clear, but court documents showed Cameco paid the Barbados subsidiary 50 per cent of its Swiss subsidiary's pre-tax profits in 2005.

The CRA claimed that the Swiss subsidiary profits had to be taxed at Canadian rates, because these subsidiaries did not carry out any real business activities and were just paper companies. It wanted Cameco to pay $2.1 billion in back taxes. Cameco argued that its offshore structures were legitimate and permitted by Canadian tax laws.

In 2018, a judge from the Tax Court of Canada, as well 3 judges from the Federal Court of Appeal ruled in Cameco's favour and found the manner it acted in to be lawful. The Tax Court also awarded the company with $10.25 million in legal fees and up to $17.9 million in disbursements for costs incurred. The CRA looked for a final appeal from the Supreme Court of Canada, but on February 18, 2021, the Court declined to hear the appeal. The lower courts' rulings thus were rendered final, leaving the CRA with no further means to pursue this case.

== See also ==
- Uranium Participation Corporation
- Nuclear power
- Anti-nuclear movement in Canada
- Nuclear power in Canada
