= Co-operative Block Building =

- U.S. National Register of Historic Places
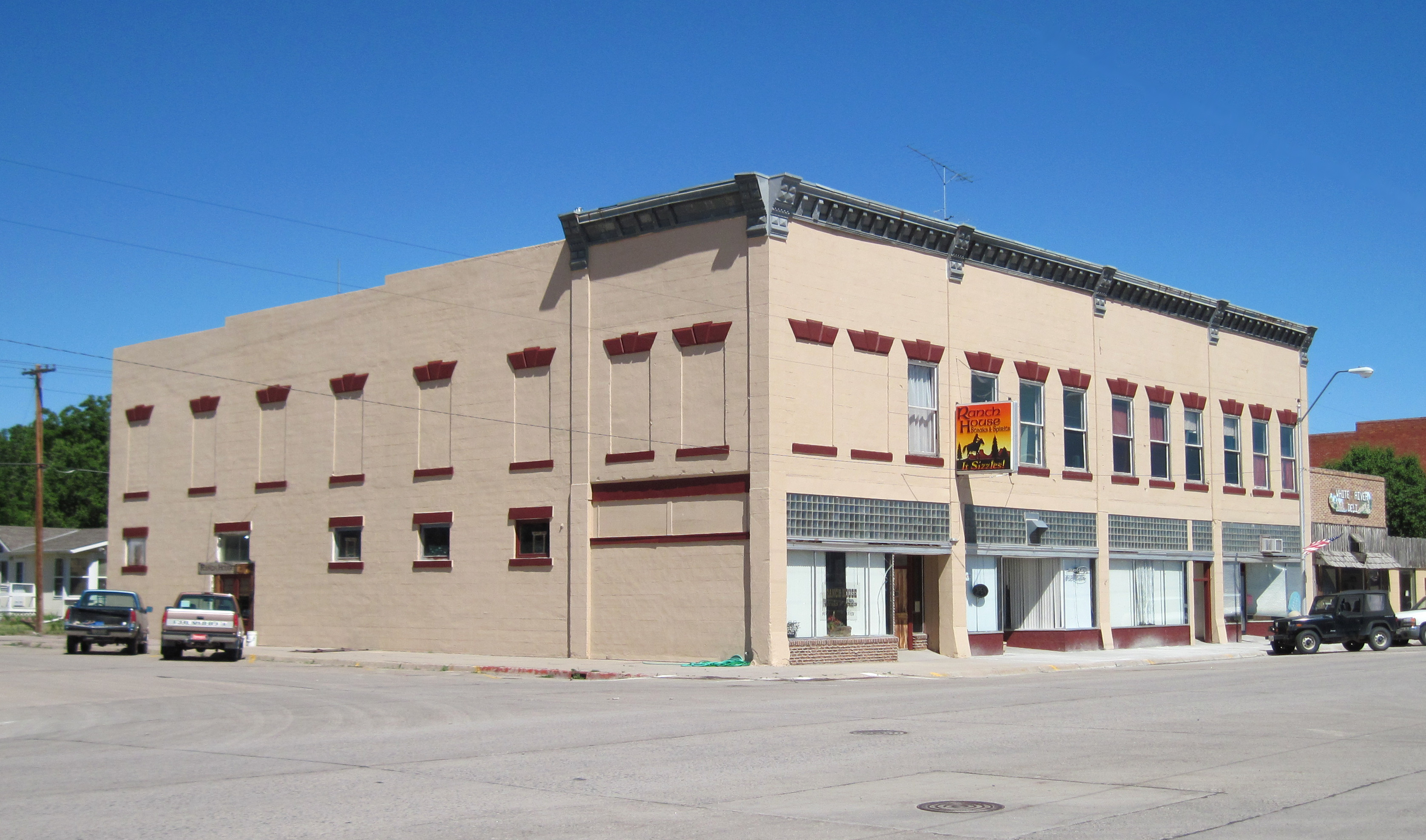
- Southeast elevation, 2012

- Location within Nebraska Location within the United States
- Location: 435-445 2nd St., Crawford, Nebraska
- Coordinates: 42°41′6″N 103°24′47″W
- Area: less than one acre
- Built: 1909
- Built by: Inman, C.R.
- Architect: Stanton, Wm., & Sons
- Architectural style: Gothic
- NRHP reference No.: 85002146
- Added to NRHP: September 12, 1985

The Co-operative Block Building is a commercial structure in downtown Crawford, Nebraska, United States. It was built in 1909 and added to the National Register of Historic Places on September 12, 1985. It is also known locally as Co-op Block, Midwest Block, or The Broken Spur, after the business that it currently houses.

== Description ==
The Co-operative Block Building is a two-story Victorian commercial edifice in Crawford at the northwest corner of 2nd and Linn Streets on lots 9, 10, 11, and 12 of block 10 of the original townsite. It was built in 1909 of reinforced concrete and has plastered exterior walls; however, the interior structure utilized a wooden infrastructure. The edifice is square in shape, at 100-foot (30 m) by 100-foot (30 m), and has a relatively flat roof. The front (east) facade is symmetrically organized and divided into four bays, a division which is further achieved inside the building. The storefronts have been replaced since the original construction (although they still consist mainly of glass), and some of the upper-story windows have been filled in. The facade is topped by a pressed metal cornice with brackets designed to look like dentils. Although a sign inscribed with the building's name originally embellished the top of the structure, it has since been removed, along with other cornice embellishments. There is a basement entrance on the building's south side.

== History ==
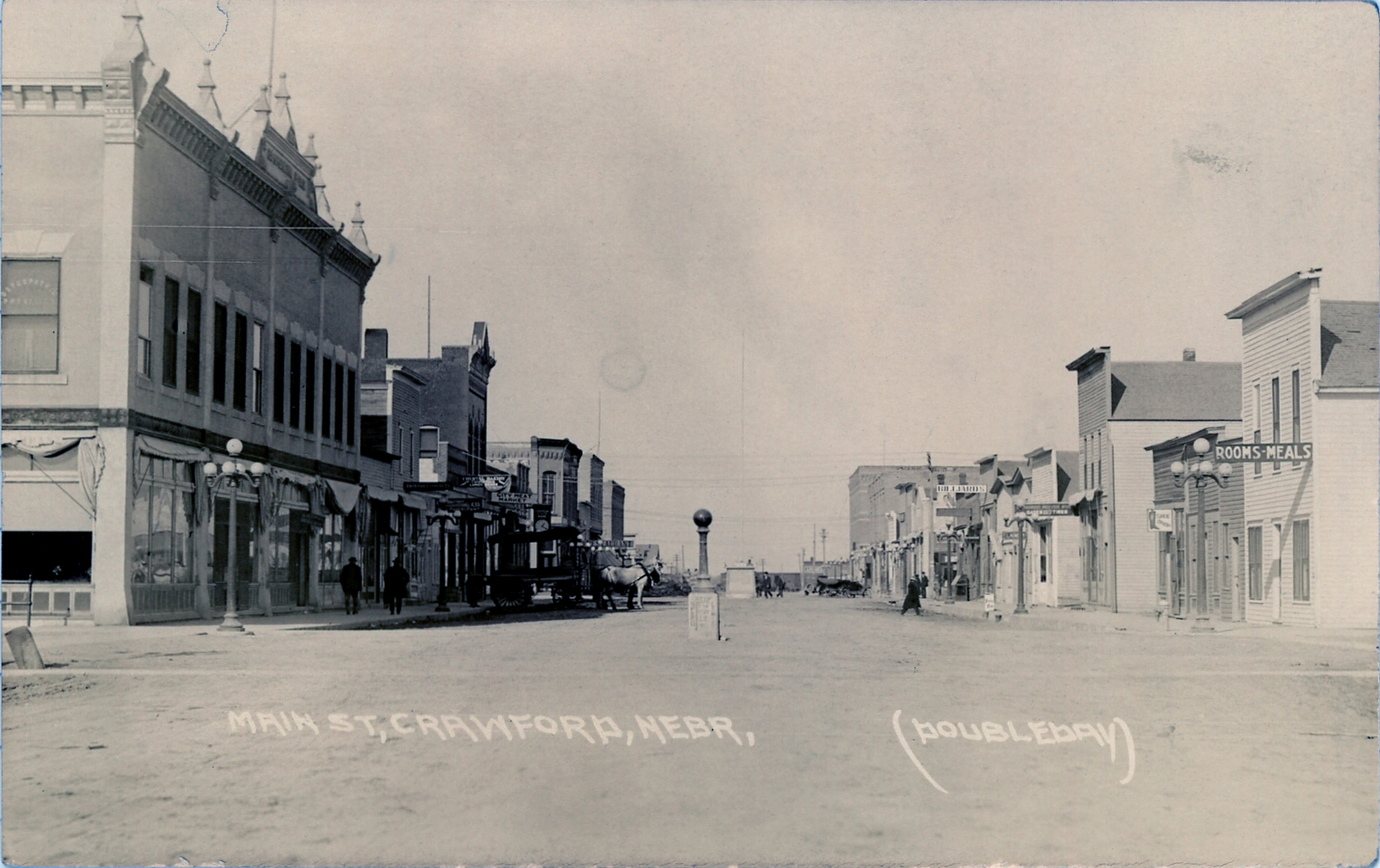
Downtown Crawford, late 1910s. Co-op Block is on the left.

The Crawford Co-operative Company was founded on June 11, 1907 by William J. A. Raum, C. H. Britton, W. A. Eversull, Bernard Soester, J. H. Hulseman, and Edwin Kluman. The purpose of the organization was to be "the buying, selling and holding of real estate, engaging in the general merchandise business, the buying and selling of all kinds of farm products, poultry and eggs". The Company officially began business on July 9, 1907; its capital stock was worth $100,000. On April 14, 1908 the company approved the plans and specifications submitted by William Stanton & Sons for the construction of the present Co-operative Block Building. Although it was originally to be built with its floors and roof entirely of concrete, the interior infrastructure was ultimately built using slow-burning heavy mill construction. Erected in 1909, the Co-operative Block Building was the first building to use reinforced concrete construction in the Crawford area. The Company dissolved in 1977.

The structure has been occupied by a grocery store, a funeral parlor, and Midwest Hardware. It was also used for offices, apartments, and a meeting space for the Ku Klux Klan. A 1939 fire, thought to originate in the basement, caused considerable damage to the building, although no casualties occurred. In 1978 a restaurant, O'Doherty's, was opened in the building by Tom and Donna Spence. The structure was refurbished, and a back bar from a historic saloon in Summit, South Dakota was added. Some of the new furbishing came from the Crawford's former Gate City Hotel. Later, the business was acquired by Butch and Becky Sellman, who in turn sold it to the Kreman family. The building is currently owned by the Juhlin family, and the restaurant is currently in operation as The Broken Spur Saloon, as well as housing Waning Moon Studio.
