= Crow Butte =

Uranium mine in Nebraska, United States

Crow Butte Mine
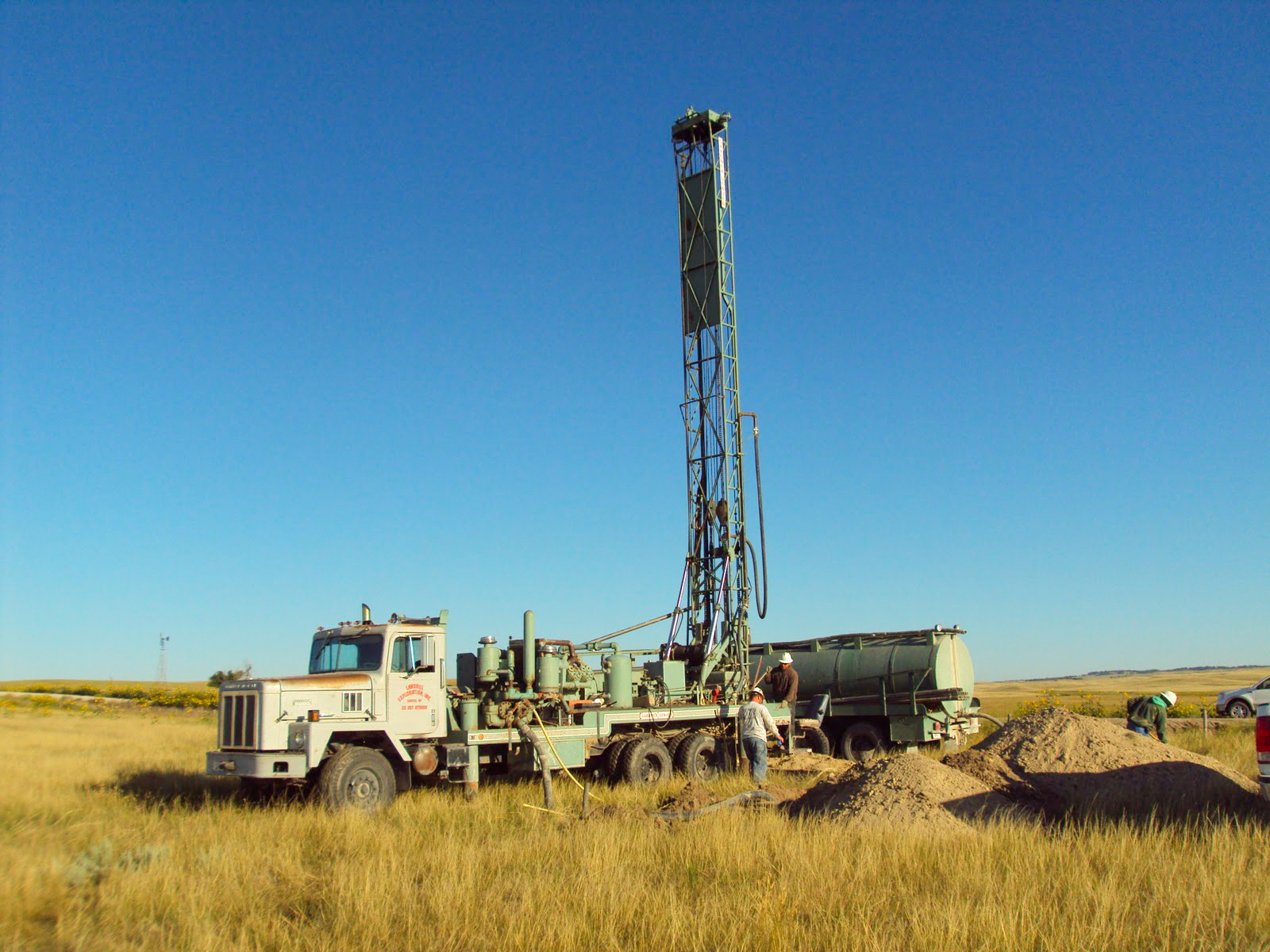
- Drilling for uranium on Crow Butte's Marsland Expansion Area

- Location in Nebraska

Location
- Location: Dawes County, near Crawford, Nebraska, United States; 42°38′43.62″N 103°21′23.56″W

Production
- Products: Uranium as U_{3}O_{8}
- Production: 0.4 million pounds U_{3}O_{8}
- Financial year: 2015

History
- Discovered: 1980
- Opened: 1991
- Closed: 2018

Owner
- Company: Cameco Resources
- Website: www.cameco.com
- Acquired: 1998

Crow Butte is a uranium mining operation located four miles (6 km) southeast of the city of Crawford in Dawes County, Nebraska, United States. Cameco Corporation owns and operates Crow Butte through its wholly owned subsidiary, Crow Butte Resources, Inc.

== History ==
Crow Butte was the first uranium mine developed in Nebraska. It was discovered in 1980 and begin production in April 1991. It is a roll-front uranium deposit, mined using in-situ recovery (ISR). Due to weakening of the uranium market, production ceased in 2018. The project is under care and maintenance pending an improvement in uranium prices.

== Description ==
At Crow Butte, uranium ore is mined in place underground in well fields. Uranium is extracted from basal Chadron Formation sandstone aquifers 400–800 feet (120–240 m) below the surface by the in-situ recovery process. A solution of water, oxygen and sodium bicarbonate (baking soda) is injected into the orebody, which liberates the uranium from its sandstone host and allows recovery by production wells. The solution is pumped to the surface and uranium is removed at the processing plant. The mine's processing plants and well fields have a licensed capacity of 2 million pounds per year.

During 2015 Crow Butte produced 0.4 million pounds U_{3}O_{8}, 33% less than 2014, due to a declining head grade. Between 2002 and 2015, the Crow Butte operation produced 10.1 million pounds of U_{3}O_{8}.

== Resources ==
As of 31 December 2019 the measured and indicated resources at Crow Butte were 13.9 million pounds of U_{3}O_{8} at a grade of 0.25%. The developed uranium deposit at Crow Butte has been progressively depleted by production.

=== License expansion ===
To allow the mine plant to continue operating, three new expansion sites are under application for license review by the US Nuclear Regulatory Commission, all within several miles of the plant. Material from the three sites would be transported to the central plant at Crow Butte for final processing. In 2015, the Oglala Sioux Tribe lodged six objections with the Atomic Safety and Licensing Board against the expansion of the mine's operating license to include the Marsland Expansion Area (south of the current site), claiming Crow Butte was a sacred site and within their treaty territory. Construction at Marsland create surface disturbance of 600 acres, with future construction disturbing another 1,160 acres.

== Ownership ==
The Crow Butte facility was originally developed by Wyoming Fuel Corporation in 1986 and subsequently acquired and operated by Ferret Exploration Company of Nebraska. In 1994, Ferret Exploration Company changed its name to Crow Butte Resources, Inc. In 1998 Crow Butte Resources was acquired by Cameco Resources Inc., the U.S. subsidiary of the Canadian company, Cameco Corporation. Cameco is the largest producer of uranium in the US, and accounts for 18% of global uranium production from its mines in Canada, the US and Kazakhstan.

== See also ==
- Sandstone uranium deposits
