= Nebkota Railway =

- Nebkota Railway Engine No.49, an EMD GP7 locomotive.

Overview
- Headquarters: Chadron, Nebraska
- Reporting mark: NRI
- Locale: Nebraska
- Dates of operation: 1994–2013
- Predecessor: Chicago and North Western Transportation Company
- Successor: Nebraska Northwestern Railroad (surviving trackage)

Technical
- Track gauge: 4 ft 8 1/2 in (1,435 mm) standard gauge
- Length: 73.5 miles (118.3 km)

The Nebkota Railway (reporting mark NRI) was a Class III railroad that began operations in 1994 with 73.5 miles (118.3 km) of former Chicago and North Western Transportation Company Cowboy Line track between Merriman and Chadron, Nebraska. Prior to the abandonments, the railroad hauled primarily grain along with some gravel and timber.

== History ==
Founded in 1994, the railroad's purpose was to haul grain from elevators in Merriman and other locations farther west, via trackage rights to its connection with the Dakota, Minnesota and Eastern, now Rapid City, Pierre and Eastern Railroad at Dakota Junction and a further 20 miles (32 km) by trackage rights to a connection with the Burlington Northern Santa Fe at Crawford, Nebraska. Due to a loss of grain shipments from Gordon, Nebraska in 2006, the railroad abandoned the eastern 43 miles (69 km) of its line between Merriman and Rushville, Nebraska. In September 2007, the railroad abandoned the line between Rushville and 4 miles (6.4 km) east of Chadron due to the loss of grain traffic to larger main-line loading facilities. In addition to freight service, the railway offered a three-hour passenger excursion service as a dinner train that ran through the scenic Pine Ridge area near Chadron. In 2010, the newly formed Nebraska Northwestern Railroad purchased the line between Dakota Junction and Chadron, including the Chadron rail yard. Nebkota retained its trackage rights.

In January 2010, West Plains Company, owner of the Nebkota, announced plans to construct a 14 million-dollar grain loading facility on the remaining 4 miles (6.4 km) of track east of Chadron capable of loading a 126-car unit train in 10 hours. After local opposition and the purchase of the track between Dakota Junction and Chadron by Nebraska Northwestern Railroad, the large loading facility was instead built near Alliance, Nebraska and a much smaller $800,000 grain loading auger was built northwest of Chadron.

On August 26, 2013 John Nielsen, owner of the Nebraska Northwestern Railroad filed a petition with the Surface Transportation Board to purchase 100% of Nebkota's stock and assume control of the railroad from owner West Plains, LLC. The petition noted Nebkota had no current customers, no current employees, and its trackage rights to Crawford, Nebraska were inactive. Planned replacement of ties before winter, development of business and rail opportunities as part of an effort to restore service, and the strong support of West Plains, LLC were cited as reasons to expedite the petition.

On November 20, 2013 the Surface Transportation Board authorized John Nielsen to gain control of the Nebkota as of December 15, 2013.

On April 11, 2017 the Surface Transportation Board approved a corporate merger effective in May 2017 between Nebkota Railway and Nebraska Northwestern Railroad with Nebraska Northwestern being the surviving corporate entity.

== Roster ==
Number	Builder	Model	Date
49	EMD	GP7	1952
54	EMD	FP9A	1958
55	EMD	FP7A	1953
66	EMD	F9B	1955
613	EMD	SD9E	1957
614	EMD	SD9E	1957
