= Niagara Junction Railway =

Switching railway in New York

Overview
- Headquarters: Niagara Falls, New York, United States
- Locale: Niagara County, New York
- Dates of operation: 1892–March 31, 1976
- Successor: Conrail

Technical
- Track gauge: 4 ft 8 1/2 in (1,435 mm) standard gauge
- Electrification: overhead line 600 V DC
- Length: 44 miles (71 km)

The Niagara Junction Railway (reporting marks NJ, NIAJ) was a switching railroad serving Niagara Falls, New York.

== History ==
The company was created in 1898 as a subsidiary of the Niagara Falls Hydraulic Power and Manufacturing Company. In 1913 the line was electrified. In 1948 the Niagara Falls Power Company sold the railroad to its connecting companies: the New York Central, the Erie, and the Lehigh Valley. After a series of mergers in the 1960s, the Niagara Junction was finally dissolved as an independent company in 1976 when the Consolidated Rail Corporation was formed to take over operations of bankrupt railroads in the Northeast. The line was dieselized in 1979. After over a year of storage, three electric locomotives were overhauled in December 1980 and transferred to Grand Central Terminal in New York City.

=== Incidents ===
Just after 9:30 am on Wednesday 22 January 1958, a tank car exploded while being switched at the Niagara Junction's yard on Porter Road. The blast injured at least 60 people, and left a crater 150 feet (46 m) in diameter and 40 feet (12 m) deep. The cause was never determined.

== Locomotives ==
Number	Builder & type	Date	Serial number	Notes
1	line car			
1	Baldwin 0-6-0 steam	October 1897	17200	sold 1915
2	Baldwin 0-4-0T steam	September 1893	13726	sold 1915
3	Baldwin-Westinghouse steeplecab	May 1913	39865	scrapped 1952
4	Baldwin-Westinghouse steeplecab	May 1913	39866	to Cornwall Street Railway Light and Power Company 9 (second) in 1952; scrapped June 1973
5	Baldwin-Westinghouse steeplecab	Dec 1916	44602	scrapped
6	Baldwin-Westinghouse steeplecab	Feb 1920	53027	to Sand Springs Railway 1005 in 1946
7	Baldwin-Westinghouse steeplecab	Feb 1920	53050	to Sand Springs Railway 1006 in 1946; scrapped 1956
8	Baldwin-Westinghouse steeplecab	Dec 1928	60699	to PATCO Speedline for parts in October 1973 scrapped
9	Baldwin-Westinghouse steeplecab	Jun 1937	62072	to PATCO Speedline 404 in October 1973 scrapped
10	Baldwin-Westinghouse steeplecab	Apr 1924	57715	ex-Chicago South Shore and South Bend Railroad 1005 in December 1941; scrapped
11	Baldwin-Westinghouse steeplecab	Apr 1924	57716	ex-Chicago South Shore and South Bend Railroad 1006 in December 1941; retired by 1965
12				ex-Oklahoma Railway Company 606 in 1946; scrapped 1952
13	General Electric E10B	Jun 1952	31136	renumbered 18 in July 1952
14	General Electric E10B	Jul 1952	31137	to Conrail 4750 in August 1977; assigned to Metropolitan Transportation Authority in December 1980; sold to Metro-North Commuter Railroad 401 in 1983; scrapped 1998
15	General Electric E10B	Jul 1952	31138	to Conrail 4751 in August 1977; sold to General Electric in 1983 and stored awaiting preservation
16	General Electric E10B	Jul 1952	31139	to Conrail 4752 in August 1977; assigned to Metropolitan Transportation Authority in December 1980; sold to Metro-North Commuter Railroad 402 in 1983; scrapped 1998
17	General Electric E10B	Jul 1952	31140	to Conrail 4753 in August 1977; assigned to Metropolitan Transportation Authority in December 1980; sold to Metro-North Commuter Railroad 403 in 1983; scrapped 1998
18	General Electric E10B	Jun 1952	31136	delivered as 13; to Conrail 4754 in August 1977; sold to General Electric in 1983 and scrapped
19	General Electric E10B	Jul 1952	31141	to Conrail 4755 in August 1977; scrapped
20	General Electric E10B	Aug 1952	31142	to Conrail 4756 in August 1977; sold to General Electric in 1983 and scrapped
