= Nebraska Northwestern Railroad =

Overview
- Headquarters: Chadron, Nebraska
- Reporting mark: NNW
- Locale: Nebraska
- Dates of operation: 2010–

Technical
- Track gauge: 4 ft 8 1/2 in (1,435 mm) standard gauge

The Nebraska Northwestern Railroad (reporting mark NNW) is a Class III railroad that began operations in April 2010 after it purchased 7.22 miles (11.62 km) of former Dakota, Minnesota and Eastern (DME), now Rapid City, Pierre and Eastern Railroad, previously Chicago and North Western Railway Cowboy Line track between Dakota Junction and the rail yard to the east at Chadron, Nebraska. In addition to the 7.22 miles of owned track, the railroad also leased the remainder of the DME Crawford Subdivision line westward between Dakota Junction and the connection with BNSF Railway at Crawford, Nebraska.

To the east of Chadron, the railroad had connected with the 4.5 miles of remaining track owned by the Nebkota Railway which serviced a small grain auger loading facility that had been built in 2010.

Included in the purchase of the track were the railroad facilities at Harker School, including the former Chicago and North Western roundhouse. Nebraska Northwestern intends to use the roundhouse for the repair and refurbishing of large railroad equipment.

In the spring of 2011, a 4.9 million dollar Federal TIGER grant was awarded to pay 80% of the cost of upgrading the line between Chadron and Dakota Junction to continuous rail and to add stringers and ties to the bridges between Chadron and Crawford.

In 2014 West Plains LLC built a new 2.8 million US bushels (99 million litres) grain elevator on the line just east of Dakota Junction.

== Purchase of the Nebkota ==
On August 26, 2013 Nebraska Northwestern Railroad owner John Nielsen filed a petition with the Surface Transportation Board to purchase 100% of neighboring railroad Nebkota Railway's stock and assume control of the railroad from its owner, grain company West Plains, LLC. According to the filing, operations of the Nebkota will be coordinated with those of Nebraska Northwestern, and potential shippers will benefit from greater efficiencies while receiving better service.

On November 20, 2013 the Surface Transportation Board authorized John Nielsen to gain control of the Nebkota as of December 15, 2013.

On April 11, 2017 the Surface Transportation Board approved a corporate merger effective in May 2017 between Nebkota Railway and Nebraska Northwestern Railroad with Nebraska Northwestern being the surviving corporate entity.
