= Belmont Tunnel (Nebraska) =

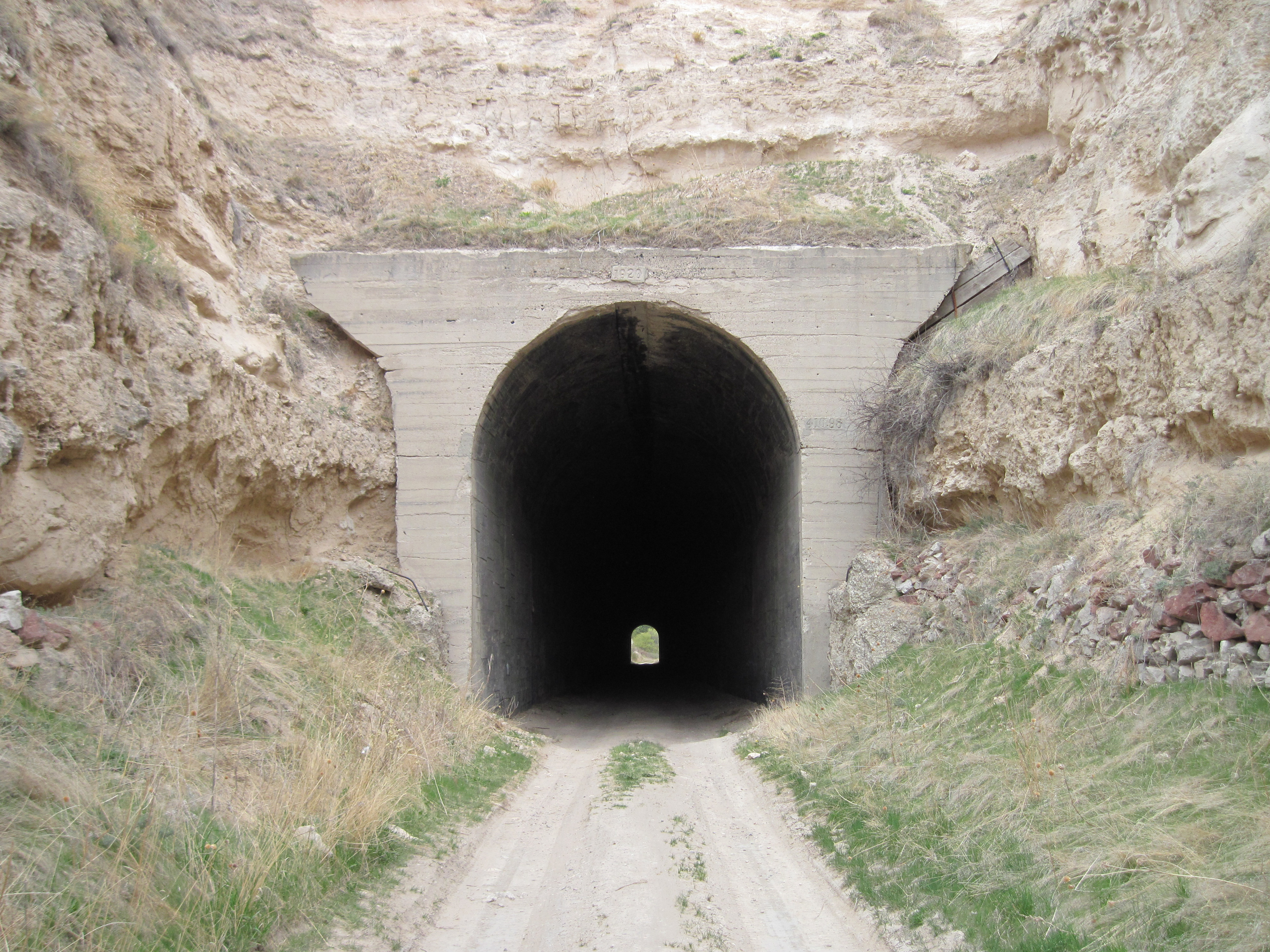
- South end of the Belmont Tunnel, 2012
- Interactive map of Belmont Tunnel

Overview
- Location: Near Belmont, Nebraska
- Coordinates: 42°33′26″N 103°21′20″W

Operation
- Work began: 1888
- Opened: August 25, 1889
- Owner: Burlington Northern and Santa Fe Railway

Technical
- Length: 698 ft (213 m)
- Track gauge: 1

The Belmont Tunnel is a 698-foot (213 m) long railway tunnel near the ghost town of Belmont about halfway between Crawford and Marsland, Nebraska, in western Dawes County. It was built by the Chicago, Burlington and Quincy Railroad in 1888-1889 and was used regularly until it was bypassed in 1982. It is the only railway tunnel ever constructed in Nebraska.

== History ==
Construction on the tunnel began in 1888, before the Chicago, Burlington and Quincy Railroad had even reached the Belmont area. The contractor was Kilpatrick Bros. & Collins. The workers being promised $1.50 to $1.74 per day, but on arriving in Belmont learned they would be earning $0.15 an hour. Many of the men went back home, but 1,200 men stayed to work on the tunnel, many of whom were Italian. The tunnel was dug from both its ends; the daily progress was normally about 3-foot (0.91 m) per end, but sometimes distances of up to 6-foot (1.8 m) were achieved. The tunnel was dug mostly through compacted sand with some thin strata of hard rock in between, making light blasting necessary. The rubble was hauled away in livestock-drawn carts. Cut locally from north and east of the site, timbers were used to support the tunnel. The Nebraska National Guard was on hand at all times to stop any vandalism attempts. The railroad trackage, heading north to Crawford from Alliance, reached the uncompleted tunnel on August 17, 1889, and Belmont served as the railway terminus until the tunnel was finished on August 25, 1889. It was lauded as one of the decade's greatest engineering feats. During World War I, guards were hired to prevent the tunnel from being sabotaged.

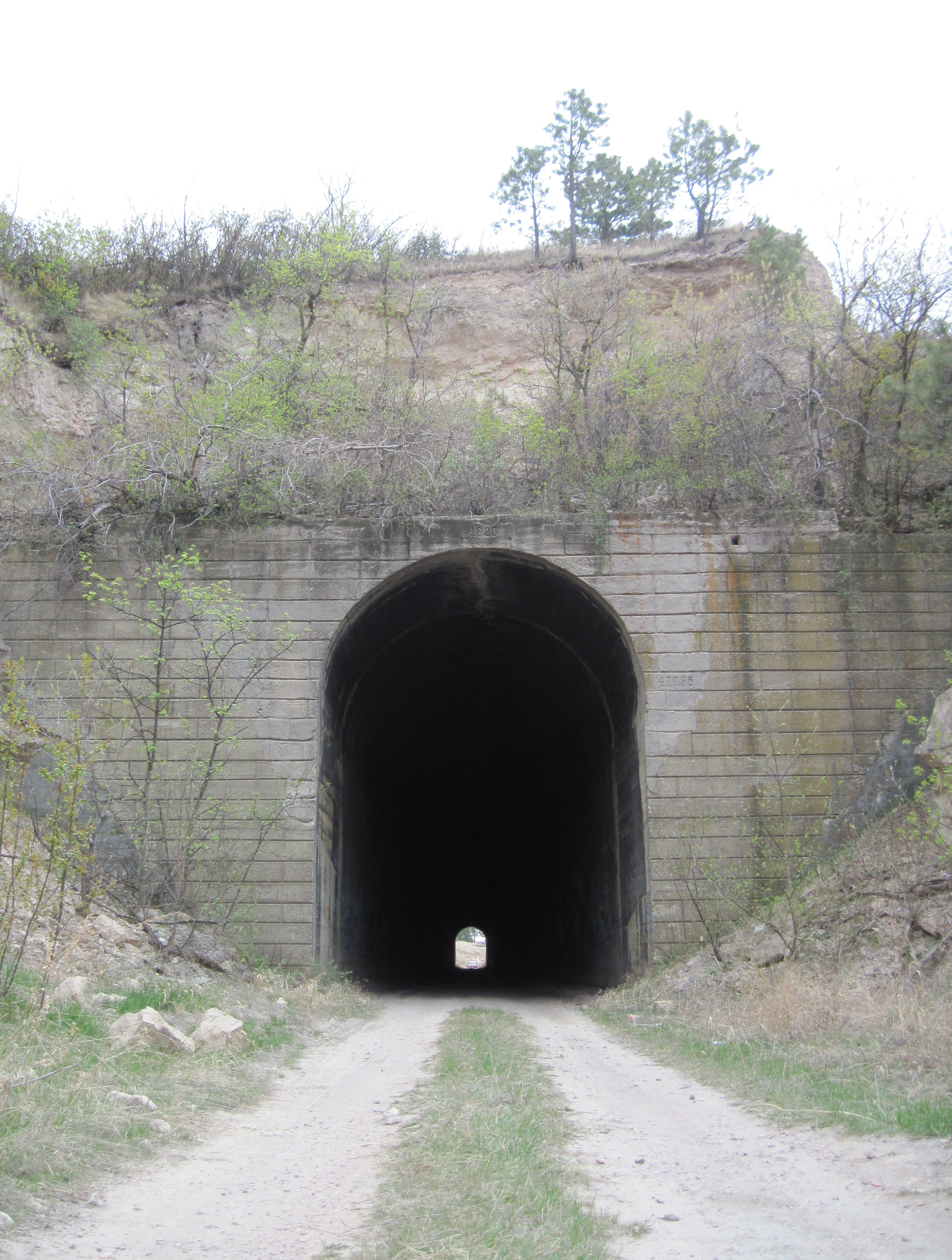
North end of the tunnel

A renovation of the tunnel was carried out in 1919-1920, after a freight train tore out a large portion of the tunnel in November 1917. After the old wooden timbers and concrete footings were removed and dumped into nearby ravines, the tunnel was re-bored and reinforced with concrete, which was poured into holes dug in the roof of the tunnel by an oil derrick. During the renovation, a worker died when a section of the tunnel collapsed, crushing him.

Passenger service on the track that ran through the tunnel stopped when the overnight train from Lincoln to northwest Nebraska was discontinued on August 24, 1969, although freight trains still used the line. Plans later developed circa 1980 to remove the tunnel and put in a larger, double-track line. However, the new line as built bypassed the tunnel, laying new trackage immediately west of the old line. The last train passed through Belmont Tunnel on May 3, 1982.

== Present day ==
The old tunnel trackage continues to be used by the railway as a service road. Although marred by graffiti, the tunnel remains in good condition. It has gained popularity locally as a tourist attraction.
