= Belmont, Nebraska =

Ghost town in Dawes County, Nebraska, United States

Belmont Evergreen City (former)
- Ghost town
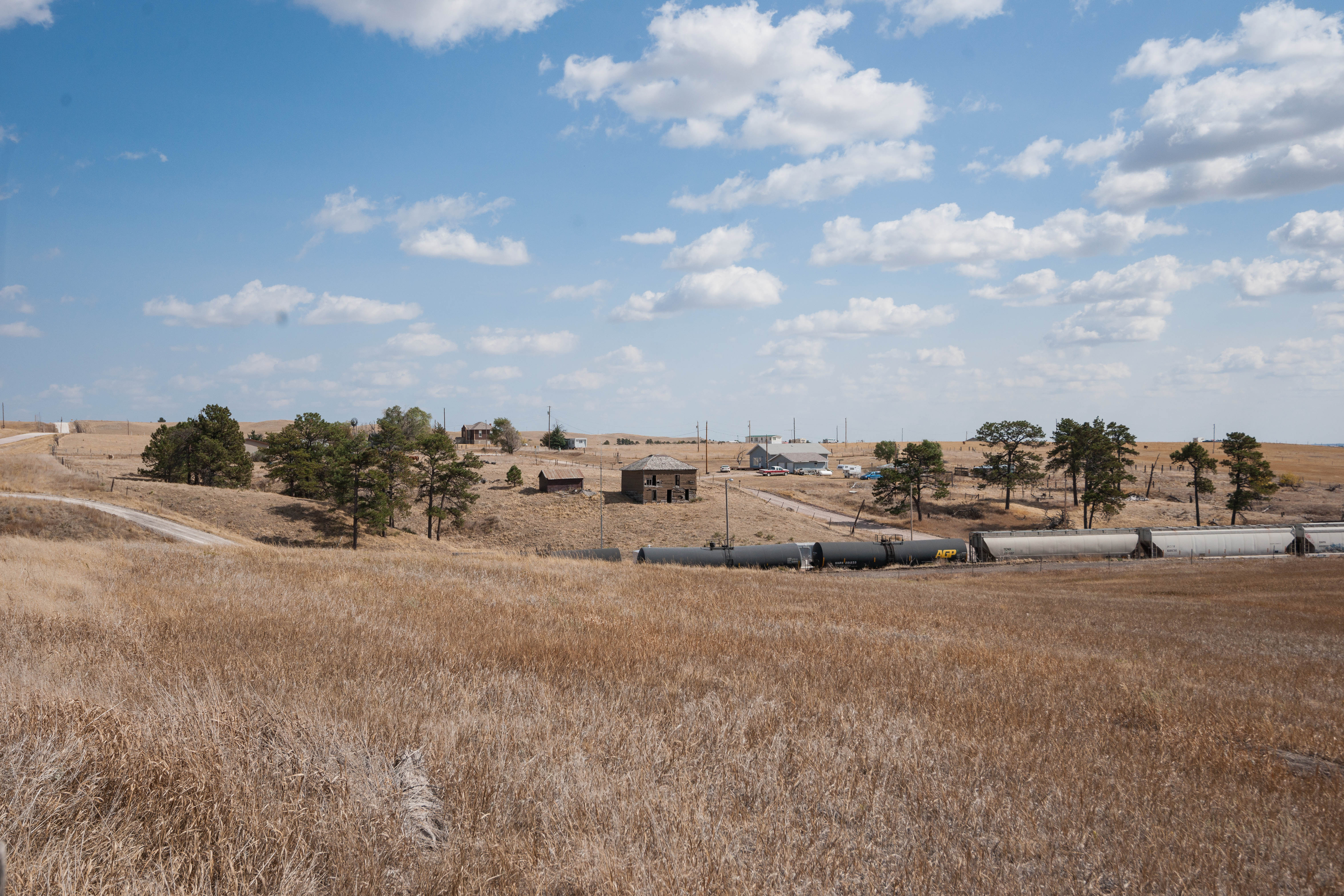
- Belmont, looking east, September 2012
- Etymology: Chicago, Burlington and Quincy Railroad official
- Interactive map of Belmont
- Coordinates: 42°32′59″N 103°21′24″W
- Country: United States
- State: Nebraska
- County: Dawes
- Established: 1889 (platted 1890)
- Elevation: 4,498 ft (1,371 m)

Population (Late 1920s)
  - Total: ~ 80
- Time zone: UTC-7 (Mountain (MST))
  - Summer (DST): MDT (UTC-6)

Belmont is a semi-ghost town in Dawes County, Nebraska, United States, approximately 11 miles (18 km) southeast of Crawford. Originally known as Evergreen City, the settlement was existent by summer 1889, due to the construction of the Belmont Tunnel. However, when the town site was surveyed in 1890, only five blocks were sold. Belmont reached its population peak of around eighty residents in the late 1920s. The trend of declining population started with the Great Depression and accelerated with changes in transportation. Improved vehicles meant that shopping and selling of farm products could be done in larger towns nearby, and the Burlington Railroad ceased passenger service in 1969.

== History ==
Shortly after the founding of Dawes County in 1885, two townships in its southwestern portion were designated the Evergreen Precinct. The Chicago, Burlington and Quincy Railroad built a rail line through the precinct in 1888–1889, and decided the deep canyons of the area made a tunnel necessary. A construction camp was soon erected near the tunnel site, and by the time the railroad reached the temporary community, now known as Evergreen City, around two hundred men were employed working on the tunnel.

When residents applied for a post office, their request was rejected, as there was already another Evergreen City in Nebraska. Ergo, the stop was renamed Belmont by the railroad, after one of its officials. The Belmont post office was established November 9, 1889; its first postmaster was Clarence L. Phelps. It continued operation for 67 years under 18 subsequent postmasters before closing on May 11, 1956.

The area was hit by a drought and economic depression in 1890–1891, and over the course of the next decade, the population of the Evergreen Precinct dropped by more than 50%. As a result, after Belmont was platted in 1890, only five blocks of the survey had been sold by 1893. However, by World War I, the rural economy had started to rebound, and Belmont reached its population peak in the late 1920s, with around eighty residents. At this time it boasted two general stores, two churches, a lumberyard, a brick school, and numerous residences.

Unfortunately, the Great Depression began a downward trend for Belmont. Improved vehicles meant that shopping and selling of farm products could be done in larger towns nearby; Belmont's last store burned in 1949 and was never rebuilt. Additionally, Belmont was economically dependent on the railroad, which ceased passenger service in 1969 because of society's increasing favor of the automobile for transportation. Belmont's depot was closed soon after.

Today, Belmont consists of a small cluster of buildings on a gravel road. Several historic structures are still intact, including the now-bypassed Belmont Tunnel and the aforementioned Belmont School. The town cemetery also remains.

== Geography ==
Belmont is located at 42°32′59″N 103°21′24″W (42.549722, -103.356667).

== Education ==
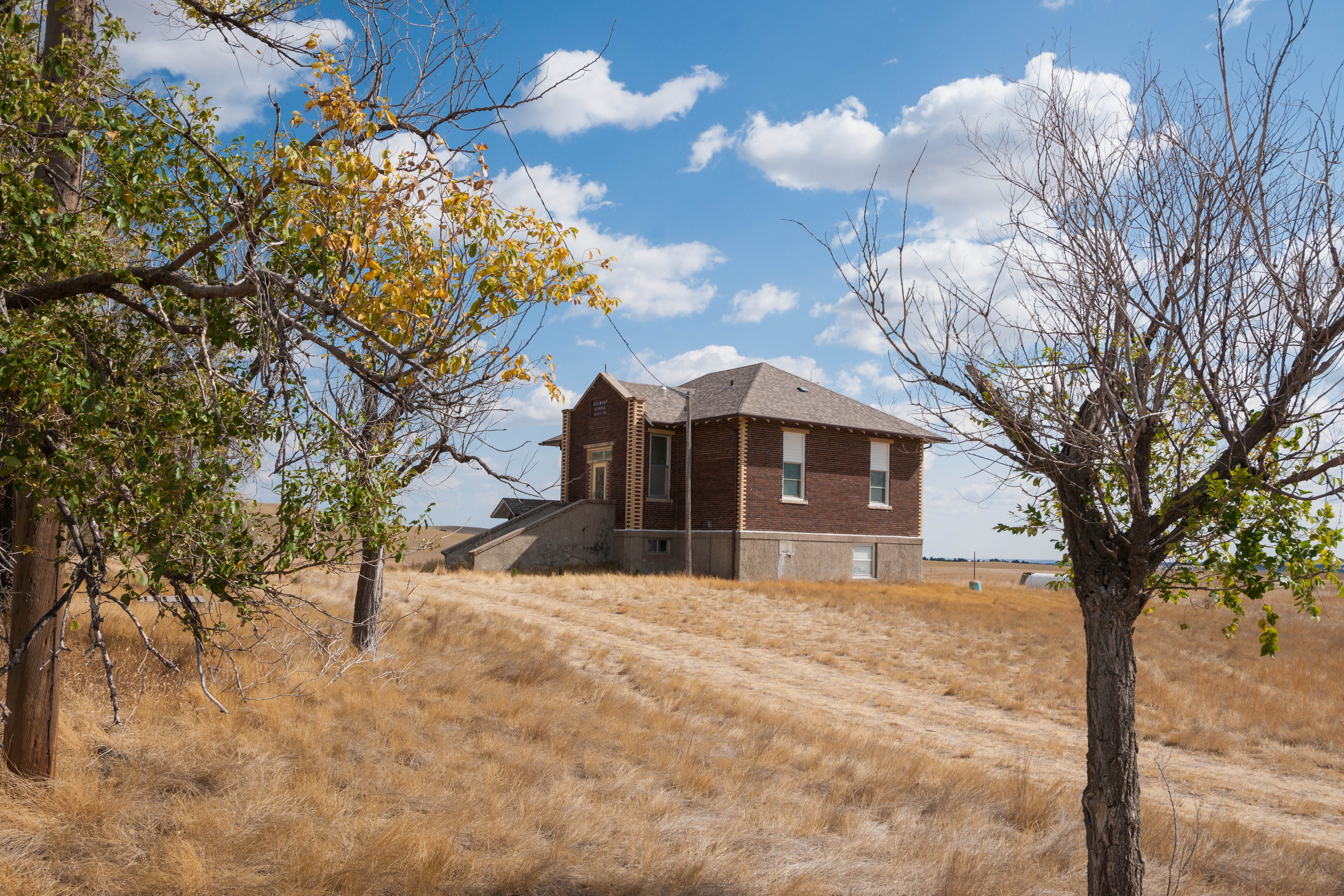
1927 Belmont schoolhouse, September 2012

School District 39 was created on September 13, 1888. Its first school building was a small wooden structure located west of Belmont, built a year later. By the 1926–1927 school year the structure had deteriorated and was deemed too small for the district's student population, leading to the erection of a two-story brick school in Belmont in 1927. The old school was moved and converted into a granary. The Belmont school stopped teaching high school classes in 1948, and started teaching Kindergarten during the fall of the following year. It also served Belmont as a spot for meetings and community dinners. The institution was active until 2008, when it was consolidated into the school district of Crawford. The building was sold at auction in 2010, and currently is being converted to a private residence, despite a fire caused by lightning in 2013.

== See also ==
- List of ghost towns in Nebraska
