= Crawford, Nebraska =

City in Dawes county, Nebraska, United States

- City
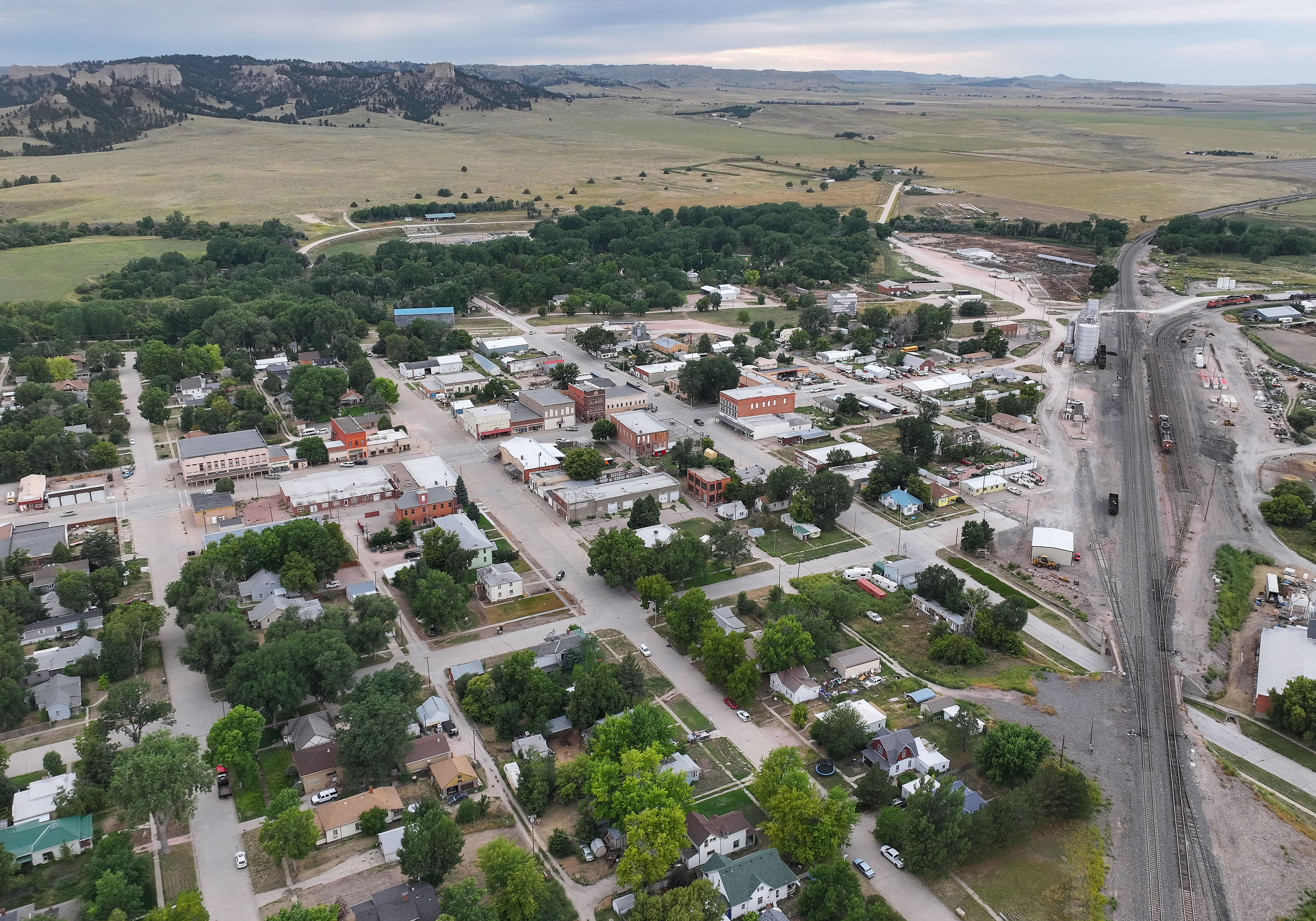
- Aerial view, 2025

- Location of Crawford, Nebraska
- Coordinates: 42°41′04″N 103°24′58″W
- Country: United States
- State: Nebraska
- County: Dawes

Area
  - Total: 1.17 sq mi (3.04 km^{2})
  - Land: 1.17 sq mi (3.04 km^{2})
  - Water: 0 sq mi (0.00 km^{2})
- Elevation: 3,681 ft (1,122 m)

Population (2020)
  - Total: 840
  - Density: 715.5/sq mi (276.26/km^{2})
- Time zone: UTC-7 (Mountain (MST))
  - Summer (DST): UTC-6 (MDT)
- ZIP code: 69339
- Area code: 308
- FIPS code: 31-11195
- GNIS feature ID: 2393663
- Website: http://www.crawfordnebraska.net/

Crawford is a city in Dawes County, Nebraska, United States, in the Great Plains region. As of the 2020 census, Crawford had a population of 840. It was incorporated in 1886 and was named for the late Captain Emmet Crawford, who had been stationed at nearby Fort Robinson.

== History ==
The Fremont, Elkhorn and Missouri Valley Railroad reached Fort Robinson in 1886 on its way to Wyoming. Several miles east of the Fort, the railroad passed through a tree claim belonging to William Annin (also spelled "Annon"), who sold his claim for a new townsite. The "tent city" that sprang up around the railroad was named after Lt. Emmet Crawford, who had been formerly stationed at Fort Robinson but was killed in Mexico in January 1886.

The town's original plat was filed on June 21, 1886 by the Western Townsite Company. E.A. Thompson and William D. Edger (editor of the original Crawford Clipper) circulated a petition for Crawford to become a village, but upon getting only 69 of the 200 needed signatures, secured the remaining signatures from willing soldiers at Fort Robinson. Crawford was incorporated in August 1886.

Seeking entertainment, the soldiers kept the town supplied with much business during its early years. Crawford was a very wild frontier town, and was home to many saloons and brothels. Calamity Jane came to Crawford from Deadwood, South Dakota with ten dancing girls and set up a tent south of town. Several murders took place in Crawford, most involving soldiers from Fort Robinson.

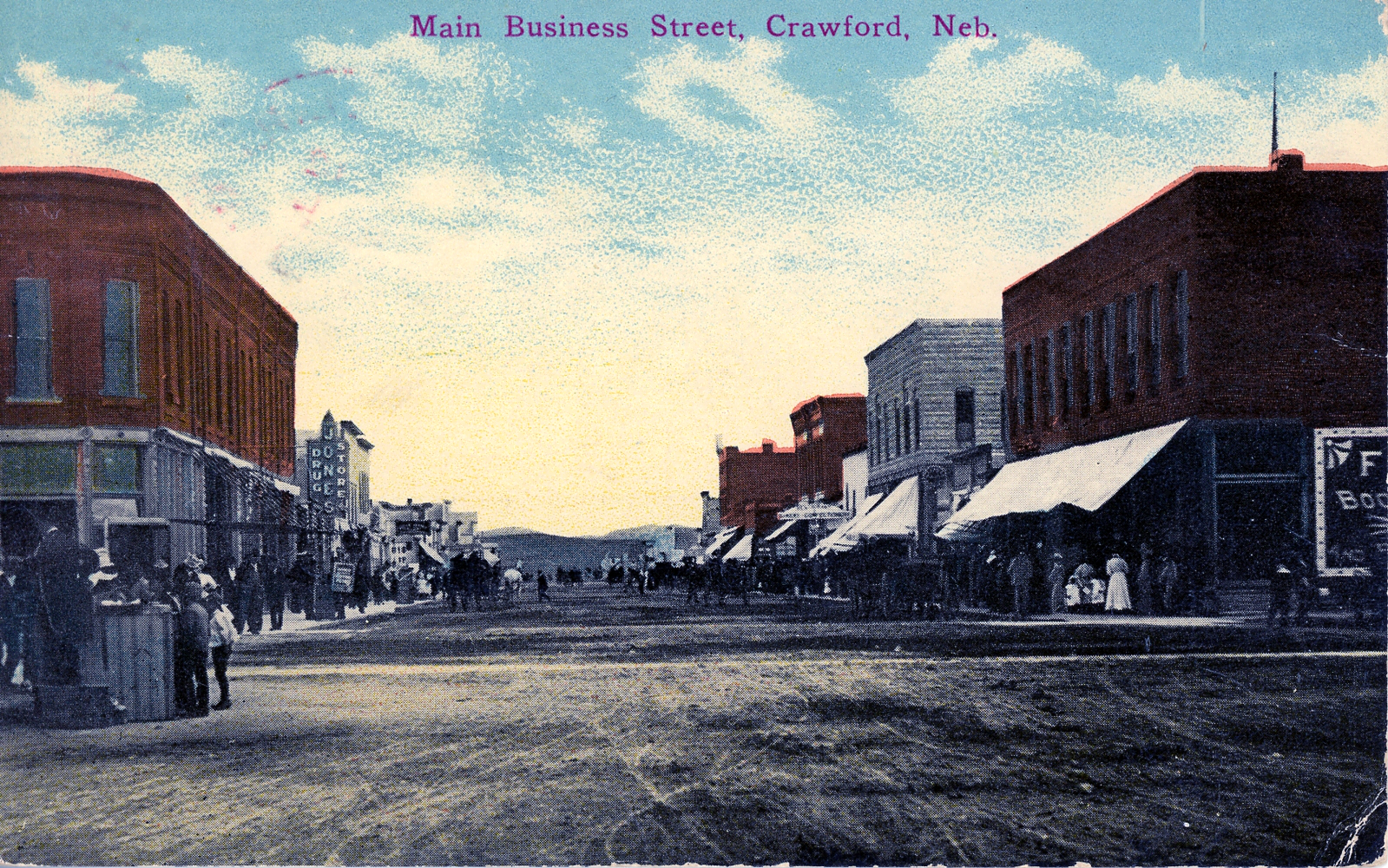
C. 1910 depiction of Second Street (Crawford's main business thoroughfare) from Main Street.

A second railroad, the Chicago, Burlington and Quincy, reached Crawford in 1889, providing an additional boost to the community. In 1907 Crawford became a city, and by 1911 Crawford had the seventh-most business volume in Nebraska. Through the following years, the town had a variety of industries, including a brick works, mica mill, pickle factory, and a Nash Finch Company warehouse. Crawford lobbied for a state normal school, but the state decided to place the school (now Chadron State College) in nearby Chadron. The state thought that Crawford's proximity to Fort Robinson would not be good for the school's young women students.

The Elite Theater was established about 1910 in a converted saloon. The theater was owned and operated by Mrs. Georgianna Higgins, thought to be the first woman theater owner in the United States.

Crawford's population peaked at 2,536 in 1910, largely because of the Kinkaid Act. It attracted many new settlers to western Nebraska who could claim public land for homesteading. But many found it impossible to successfully conduct dry-land farming on the 640-acre plots made available, and began to sell out to ranchers. The population of Crawford reflected that change and dropped to 1,646 by 1920. Businesses declined with the loss of customers. The town made some minor recovery, and the population was 1,845 in 1940. Because of urbanization and people seeking jobs, and the decline of family agriculture on the Great Plains, the population has been steadily decreasing since.

In the Lakota language, Crawford is known as oglíyotake otȟúŋwahe, or "Return and Settle City".

== Geography ==
According to the United States Census Bureau, the city has a total area of 1.18 square miles (3.06 km^{2}), all land. It is situated on the White River. Crawford sits 3,675 feet above sea level, and the surrounding area is rolling, with bluffs and low hills. The soils include sandy dirt and "gumbo" clay.

== Demographics ==
Historical population
Census	Pop.	Note	%±
1890	571		—
1900	731		28.0%
1910	1,323		81.0%
1920	1,646		24.4%
1930	1,703		3.5%
1940	1,845		8.3%
1950	1,824		−1.1%
1960	1,588		−12.9%
1970	1,438		−9.4%
1980	1,542		7.2%
1990	1,115		−27.7%
2000	1,107		−0.7%
2010	997		−9.9%
2020	840		−15.7%
U.S. Decennial Census

=== 2010 census ===
As of the census of 2010, there were 997 people, 470 households, and 249 families residing in the city. The population density was 844.9 inhabitants per square mile (326.2/km^{2}). There were 567 housing units at an average density of 480.5 per square mile (185.5/km^{2}). The racial makeup of the city was 95.6% White, 0.1% African American, 0.9% Native American, 0.2% Asian, 0.7% Pacific Islander, 0.2% from other races, and 2.3% from two or more races. Hispanic or Latino of any race were 1.0% of the population.

There were 470 households, of which 21.5% had children under the age of 18 living with them, 41.7% were married couples living together, 7.2% had a female householder with no husband present, 4.0% had a male householder with no wife present, and 47.0% were non-families. 41.9% of all households were made up of individuals, and 26% had someone living alone who was 65 years of age or older. The average household size was 2.07 and the average family size was 2.85.

The median age in the city was 49.1 years. 21% of residents were under the age of 18; 4.8% were between the ages of 18 and 24; 17.8% were from 25 to 44; 28.7% were from 45 to 64; and 27.5% were 65 years of age or older. The gender makeup of the city was 45.0% male and 55.0% female.

=== 2000 census ===
As of the census of 2000, there were 1,107 people, 473 households, and 295 families residing in the city. The population density was 969.9 inhabitants per square mile (374.5/km^{2}). There were 537 housing units at an average density of 470.5 per square mile (181.7/km^{2}). The racial makeup of the city was 93.68% White, 0.09% African American, 3.43% Native American, 0.90% from other races, and 1.90% from two or more races. Hispanic or Latino of any race were 1.99% of the population.

There were 473 households, out of which 27.9% had children under the age of 18 living with them, 48.6% were married couples living together, 9.9% had a female householder with no husband present, and 37.6% were non-families. 34.9% of all households were made up of individuals, and 20.9% had someone living alone who was 65 years of age or older. The average household size was 2.26 and the average family size was 2.92.

In the city, the population was spread out, with 24.8% under the age of 18, 7.1% from 18 to 24, 21.8% from 25 to 44, 23.3% from 45 to 64, and 22.9% who were 65 years of age or older. The median age was 42 years. For every 100 females, there were 78.0 males. For every 100 females age 18 and over, there were 75.2 males.

As of 2000 the median income for a household in the city was $28,095, and the median income for a family was $35,139. Males had a median income of $26,250 versus $19,000 for females. The per capita income for the city was $14,891. About 9.7% of families and 15.0% of the population were below the poverty line, including 21.0% of those under age 18 and 14.8% of those age 65 or over.

== Arts and culture ==
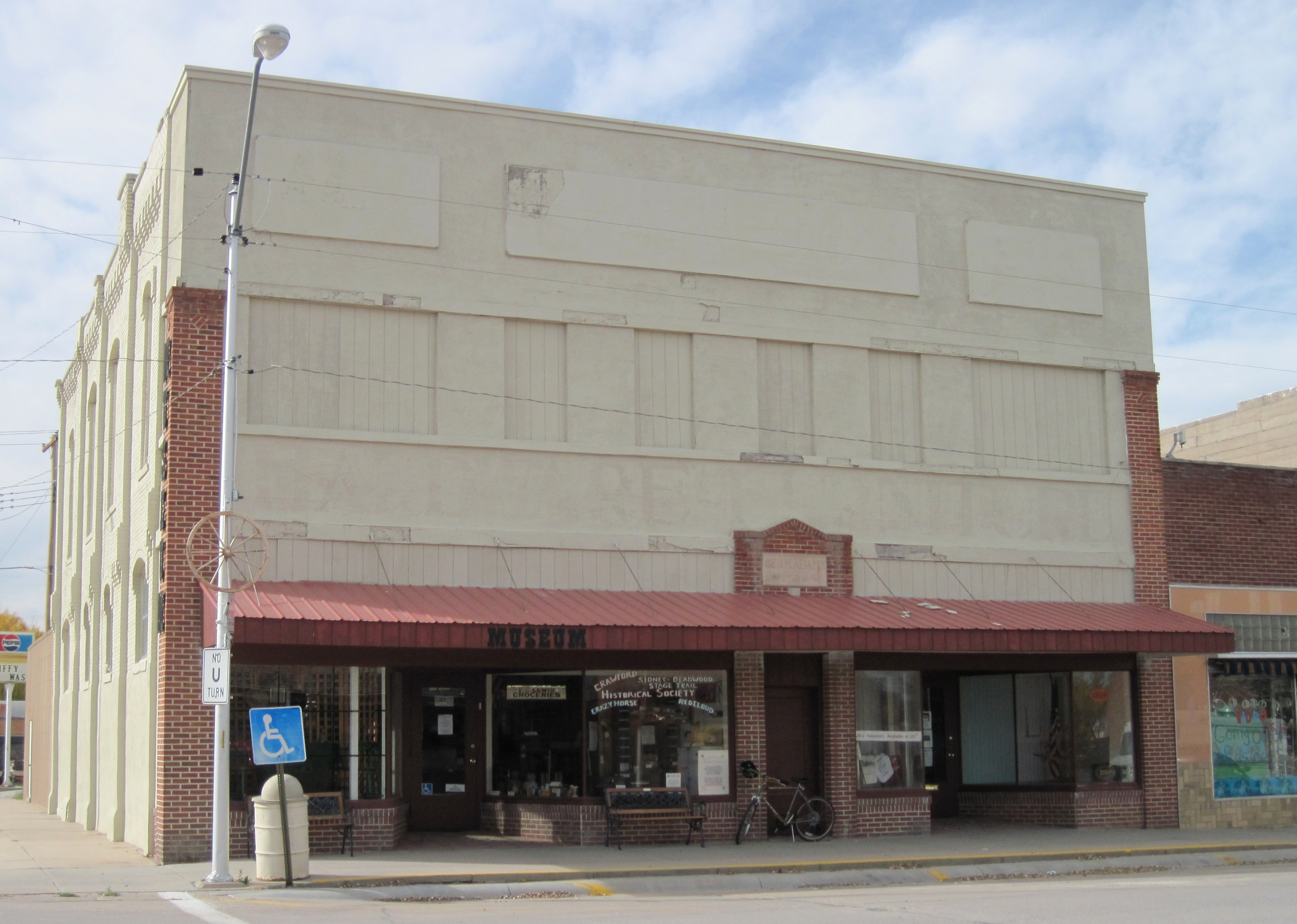
The Adams Block in downtown Crawford, housing the Crawford Historical Museum.

Crawford and its surrounding area include several cultural institutions. Crawford's primary library is the Crawford Public Library. The Crawford Historical Museum contains artifacts and materials relevant to the city's history. Fort Robinson is a state park and National Historic Landmark District several miles west of Crawford that includes two museums and a play theatre. Located south of Crawford, near the ghost town of Belmont, is the Belmont Tunnel. Also, two sites listed on the National Register of Historic Places are within the city limits, the Co-operative Block Building and the US Post Office.

=== Annual cultural events ===
Yearly events in Crawford include the Peabody Hale Fiddle Contest, the Old West Trail PRCA Rodeo, the Northwest Nebraska Rock Swap, numerous Independence Day activities, and the Fort Robinson Western & Wildlife Art Show.

== Parks and recreation ==
Crawford's city park is located in Northwest Crawford, along the White River. The other park, Peabody Hale Memorial Park, is the location of the city's swimming pool and baseball diamonds. Fort Robinson State Park and the Nebraska National Forest are also local recreational areas. Finally, Crawford has a golfing facility, the Legends Buttes Golf Course. The local rodeo grounds are west of the city park and are the location of a yearly PRCA rodeo.

== Rail transportation ==
Crawford is served by two freight railroads, BNSF Railway via Crawford Hill and the Nebraska Northwestern Railroad. The original Fremont, Elkhorn and Missouri Valley Railroad line was abandoned west of Crawford in 1992 by modern successor Chicago and North Western. There is no passenger service to or from Crawford, and the original depot has long ago been demolished. The city still remains an important point on the railroad with BNSF Railway still basing teams of one man, engineer only crews at Crawford to assist in pushing trains up the grade over Crawford Hill.

== Notable people ==
- Kermit Brashear, former speaker of the Nebraska Legislature
- Roger Hughes, football coach
- Jerry D. Mahlman, meteorologist and climatologist
- Robert L. Wheeler, Hall of Fame trainer of Thoroughbred racehorses

== See also ==
- List of municipalities in Nebraska
- Crow Butte
- Toadstool Geologic Park
- Trailside Museum of Natural History at Fort Robinson State Park
