= National Register of Historic Places listings in Madison County, Nebraska =

Location of Madison County in Nebraska

Madison County, Nebraska, United States, has 12 properties and districts listed on the National Register of Historic Places.

The locations of National Register properties and districts for which the latitude and longitude coordinates are included below may be seen in a map.

This National Park Service list is complete through NPS recent listings posted October 30, 2026.

== Current listings ==
	Name on the Register	Image	Date listed	Location	City or town	Description
1	Dommer-Haase Farmstead	Dommer-Haase Farmstead	November 5, 2018 (#100003094)	2400 W Eisenhower Ave. 42°03′42″N 97°26′37″W	Norfolk	
2	First United Presbyterian Church	First United Presbyterian Church	December 3, 2008 (#08001134)	104 E. 4th St. 41°49′38″N 97°27′15″W	Madison	
3	Grand Theater	Grand Theater	September 4, 2013 (#13000677)	120 S. 3rd St. 42°01′55″N 97°24′37″W	Norfolk	
4	Hotel Norfolk	Hotel Norfolk	December 1, 1988 (#88002755)	108 N. 4th St. 42°01′59″N 97°24′40″W	Norfolk	
5	Karl Stefan Memorial Airport Administration Building	Karl Stefan Memorial Airport Administration Building	July 11, 2002 (#02000767)	4100 S. 13th St. 41°59′05″N 97°25′47″W	Norfolk	
6	Mathewson-Gerecke House	Mathewson-Gerecke House	March 12, 2012 (#12000105)	1202 W. Norfolk Ave. 42°01′59″N 97°25′25″W	Norfolk	
7	Norfolk Carnegie Library	Norfolk Carnegie Library	December 31, 1998 (#98001567)	803 W. Norfolk Ave. 42°01′57″N 97°25′04″W	Norfolk	
8	Norfolk Masonic Temple	Norfolk Masonic Temple	November 9, 2021 (#100007150)	907 Norfolk Ave. 42°01′57″N 97°25′12″W	Norfolk	
9	St. Leonard's Catholic Church	St. Leonard's Catholic Church	November 27, 1989 (#89002038)	502-504 S. Nebraska St. 41°49′33″N 97°27′10″W	Madison	
10	Stubbs-Ballah House	Stubbs-Ballah House	December 31, 2013 (#13001021)	1000 Prospect Ave. 42°02′12″N 97°25′15″W	Norfolk	
11	U.S. Post Office and Courthouse	U.S. Post Office and Courthouse	October 9, 1974 (#74001128)	125 S. 4th St. 42°01′54″N 97°24′39″W	Norfolk	
12	John Wesley and Grace Shafer Warrick House	John Wesley and Grace Shafer Warrick House	November 28, 1990 (#90001767)	4th St. 42°01′34″N 97°44′14″W	Meadow Grove	

== See also ==
- List of National Historic Landmarks in Nebraska
- National Register of Historic Places listings in Nebraska
