= Battle Creek, Nebraska =

- City
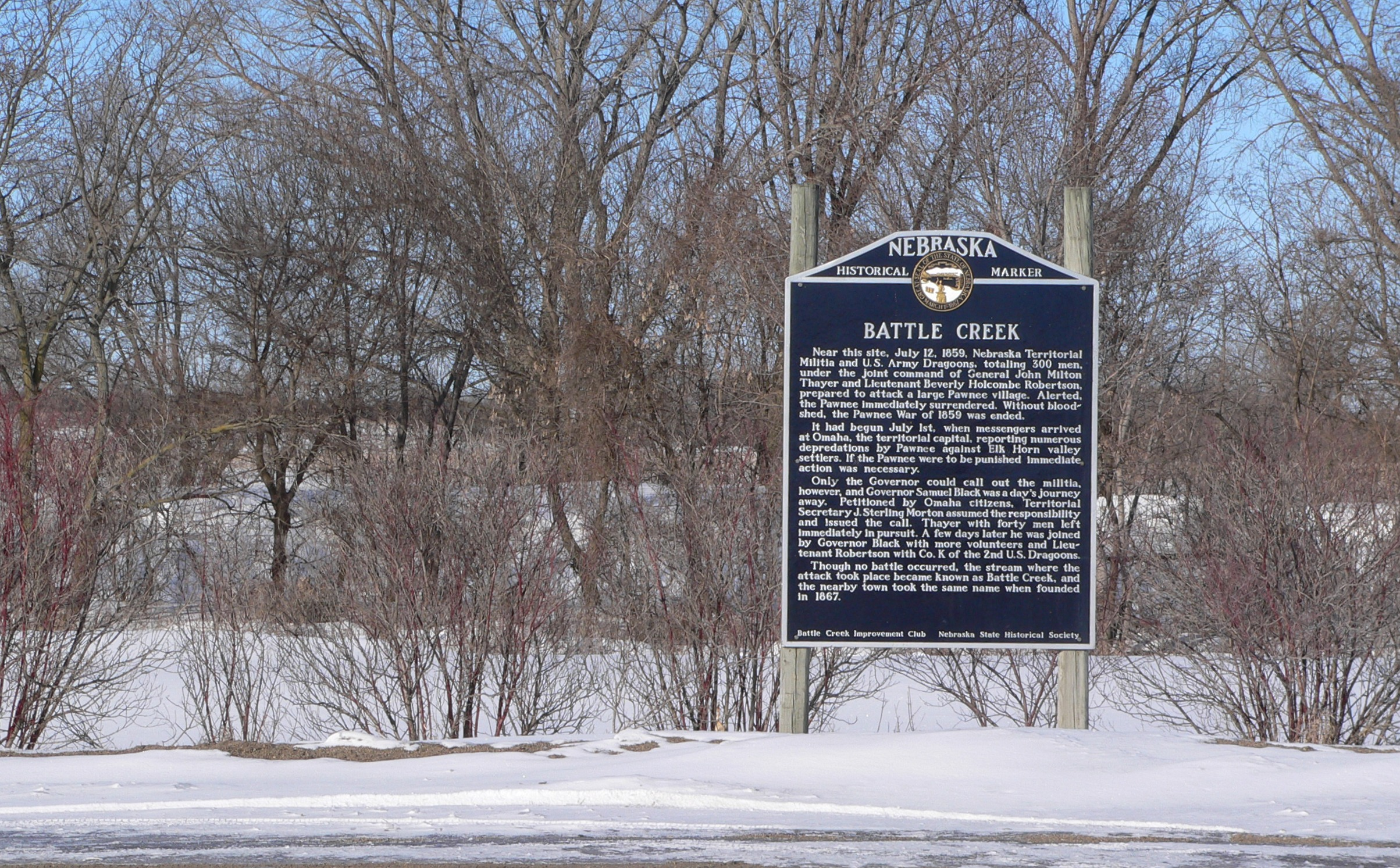
- Historical marker at northern outskirts of Battle Creek, describing the 1859 events for which the creek and the city were named

- Location in Madison County and the state of Nebraska
- Coordinates: 41°59′53″N 97°35′58″W
- Country: United States
- State: Nebraska
- County: Madison
- Established: 2009

Government

Area
  - Total: 0.71 sq mi (1.83 km^{2})
  - Land: 0.71 sq mi (1.83 km^{2})
  - Water: 0 sq mi (0.00 km^{2})
- Elevation: 1,591 ft (485 m)

Population (2020)
  - Total: 1,194
  - Density: 1,692/sq mi (653.4/km^{2})
- Time zone: UTC-6 (Central (CST))
  - Summer (DST): UTC-5 (CDT)
- ZIP code: 68715
- Area code: 402
- FIPS code: 31-03250
- GNIS feature ID: 2394082
- Website: battlecreekne.com

Battle Creek is a city in Madison County, Nebraska, United States. It is part of the Norfolk Micropolitan Statistical Area. The population was 1,194 at the 2020 census.

== History ==
In 1859, following complaints of Pawnee depredations against settlers in the Elkhorn River valley, a combined force of Nebraska Territorial Militia under the command of General John Milton Thayer and 2nd U.S. Army Dragoons under Lieutenant Beverly Holcombe Robertson prepared to attack a Pawnee village. Rather than fighting, the Pawnees surrendered before the attack could be launched. Chief Petalesharu draped an American flag over his shoulders and held a peace pipe while confronting the soldiers to stop the fight from taking place, ending the Pawnee War of 1859. Although no battle occurred, the nearby stream was dubbed Battle Creek. The town founded in the area in 1867 took the creek's name for itself.

== Geography ==
The city is in northern Madison County. Nebraska Highway 121 (4th Street) passes through the west side of the city, leading north less than 2 miles (3 km) to U.S. Route 275 and south 11 miles (18 km) to Nebraska Highway 32. Norfolk, the largest city in Madison County, is 11 miles (18 km) northeast of Battle Creek via US 275, and Madison, the county seat, is 19 miles (31 km) to the southeast via Highways 121 and 32.

According to the U.S. Census Bureau, the city of Battle Creek has a total area of 0.71 square miles (1.84 km^{2}), all land. The eponymous Battle Creek runs along the western border of the city, flowing north to the Elkhorn River near US 275.

== Demographics ==
Historical population
Census	Pop.	Note	%±
1880	123		—
1890	352		186.2%
1900	506		43.8%
1910	597		18.0%
1920	743		24.5%
1930	755		1.6%
1940	702		−7.0%
1950	630		−10.3%
1960	587		−6.8%
1970	768		30.8%
1980	948		23.4%
1990	997		5.2%
2000	1,158		16.1%
2010	1,207		4.2%
2020	1,194		−1.1%
U.S. Decennial Census

=== 2010 census ===
At the 2010 census there were 1,207 people in 457 households, including 321 families, in the city. The population density was 1,700.0 inhabitants per square mile (656.4/km^{2}). There were 480 housing units at an average density of 676.1 per square mile (261.0/km^{2}). The racial makeup of the city was 97.8% White, 0.1% African American, 1.2% Native American, 0.1% Asian, 0.5% from other races, and 0.4% from two or more races. Hispanic or Latino of any race were 0.8%.

Of the 457 households 39.2% had children under the age of 18 living with them, 59.1% were married couples living together, 7.7% had a female householder with no husband present, 3.5% had a male householder with no wife present, and 29.8% were non-families. 25.8% of households were one person and 14% were one person aged 65 or older. The average household size was 2.55 and the average family size was 3.08.

The median age was 39.7 years. 28.1% of residents were under the age of 18; 5.9% were between the ages of 18 and 24; 23.4% were from 25 to 44; 24.9% were from 45 to 64; and 17.6% were 65 or older. The gender makeup of the city was 48.2% male and 51.8% female.

=== 2000 census ===
At the 2000 census, there were 1,158 people in 434 households, including 325 families, in the city. The population density was 1,784.6 inhabitants per square mile (689.0/km^{2}). There were 447 housing units at an average density of 688.9 per square mile (266.0/km^{2}). The racial makeup of the city was 97.41% White, 0.09% African American, 1.38% Native American, 0.43% from other races, and 0.69% from two or more races. Hispanic or Latino of any race were 1.04% of the population.

Of the 434 households 40.6% had children under the age of 18 living with them, 61.8% were married couples living together, 9.7% had a female householder with no husband present, and 25.1% were non-families. 23.3% of households were one person and 13.4% were one person aged 65 or older. The average household size was 2.67 and the average family size was 3.14.

The age distribution was 31.1% under the age of 18, 6.6% from 18 to 24, 28.8% from 25 to 44, 18.7% from 45 to 64, and 14.8% 65 or older. The median age was 35 years. For every 100 females, there were 96.3 males. For every 100 females age 18 and over, there were 90.0 males.

The median household income was $43,906, and the median family income was $50,179. Males had a median income of $34,792 versus $20,536 for females. The per capita income for the city was $16,996. About 4.3% of families and 6.7% of the population were below the poverty line, including 5.4% of those under age 18 and 8.1% of those age 65 or over.
