= Warnerville =

Warnerville may refer to:

- Warnerville, Nebraska, unincorporated community
- Warnerville, New York, a hamlet in Upstate New York
- Warnerville, Queens, a neighborhood in New York City
- Warnerville, Stanislaus County, California
- Warnerville, former name of Trinidad, California
- Warnerville, Rhode Island, a summer colony on Prudence Island
