= Battle Creek (Nebraska) =

- Location of the mouth in Nebraska

Location
- Country: United States
- State: Nebraska

Physical characteristics
- Mouth
  - coordinates: 42.0213939°N 97.5920006°W
- Basin size: Elkhorn River

Battle Creek is a stream in Madison County, Nebraska, in the United States. It is a tributary of the Elkhorn River.

== History ==
Before European-American settlement in the area, the Elkhorn River Valley was occupied by the Pawnee. In July 1859, white settlers in the area complained that the Pawnee had been stealing from settlers. The reports reached the territorial capitol, Omaha, and outraged the citizens who believed the Pawnee needed to be "punished." A petition was signed by the citizens of Omaha calling for the Nebraska Territorial Militia to intervene.

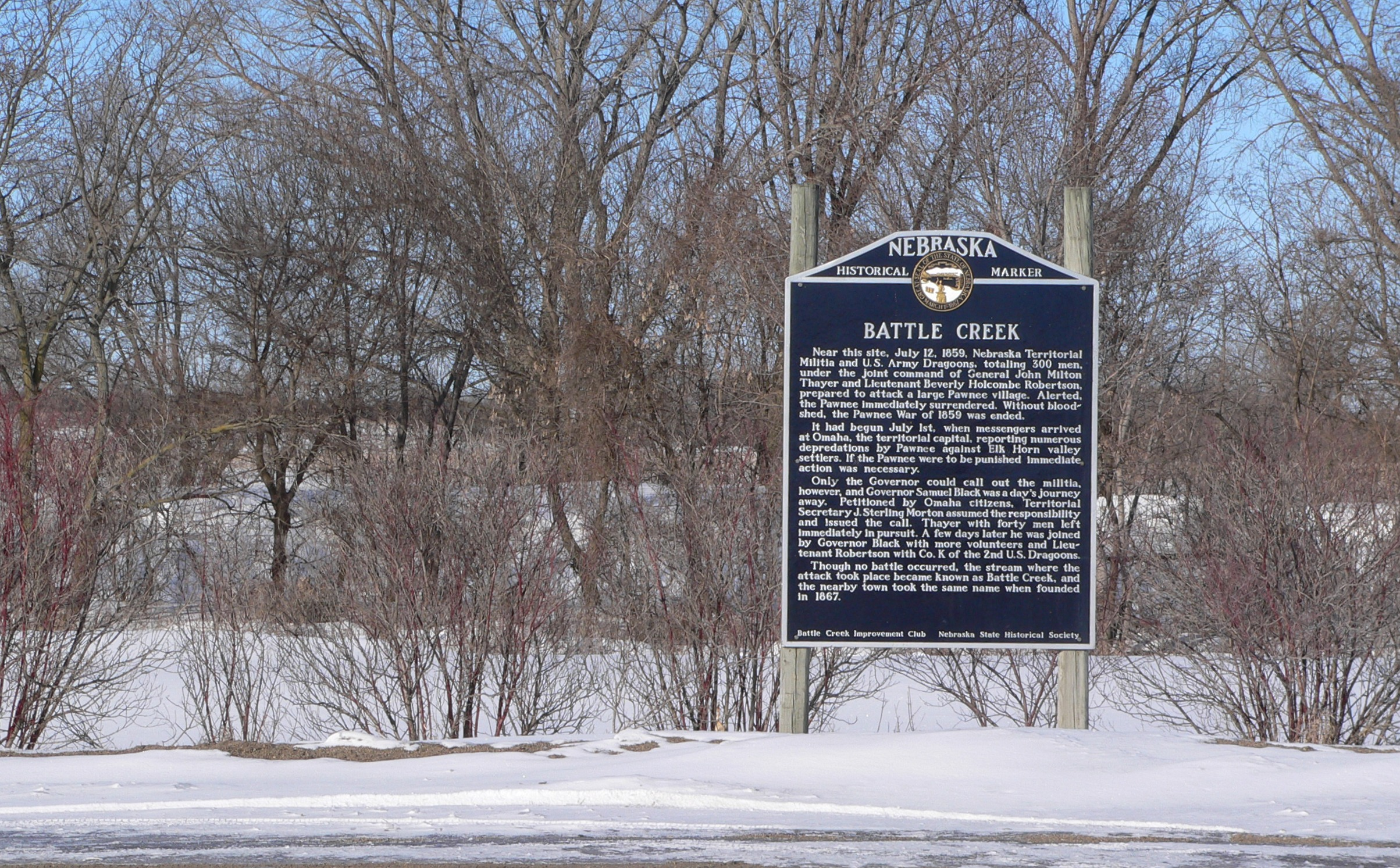
Battle Creek historical marker

The 300-man militia, led by General John Milton Thayer and Lieutenant Beverly Holcombe Robertson, headed west to attack a large Pawnee camp. The Pawnee learned of the large military force advancing toward them and immediately surrendered. The so-called "Pawnee War of 1859" was resolved without bloodshed, but the nearby creek was named Battle Creek after the incident nonetheless.

Some sources claim that "Chief Petalasharu wrapped an American flag around himself" to show goodwill to the American forces and broker peace. However, this is unsupported elsewhere and the story may have arisen from the conflation of several well-known Pawnee men named Petalesharo. The first Petalesharo was a Skidi Pawnee leader who was well-remembered and celebrated by white settlers for opposing human sacrifice, but this man died in 1836. Petalesharo was also the name of two Chaui Pawnee chiefs. The elder Petalesharo is remembered for his part in the 1833 treaty which ceded southern Nebraska to the United States. Petalesharo's son, also named Petalesharo, was born around 1823 and became head chief of the Pawnee in the early 1850s. The younger Petalesharo is likely the Petalesharo referenced, however, Petalesharo is remembered as a staunch supporter of Pawnee sovereignty and independence, so it seems unlikely that he would drape himself in the American flag.

== See also ==
- Battle Creek, Nebraska
- American Indian Wars
- Manifest destiny
- Settlement of the Americas
- List of rivers of Nebraska
