= Warrick House (Meadow Grove, Nebraska) =

Historic house in Nebraska, United States

- John Wesley and Grace Shafer Warrick House
- U.S. National Register of Historic Places
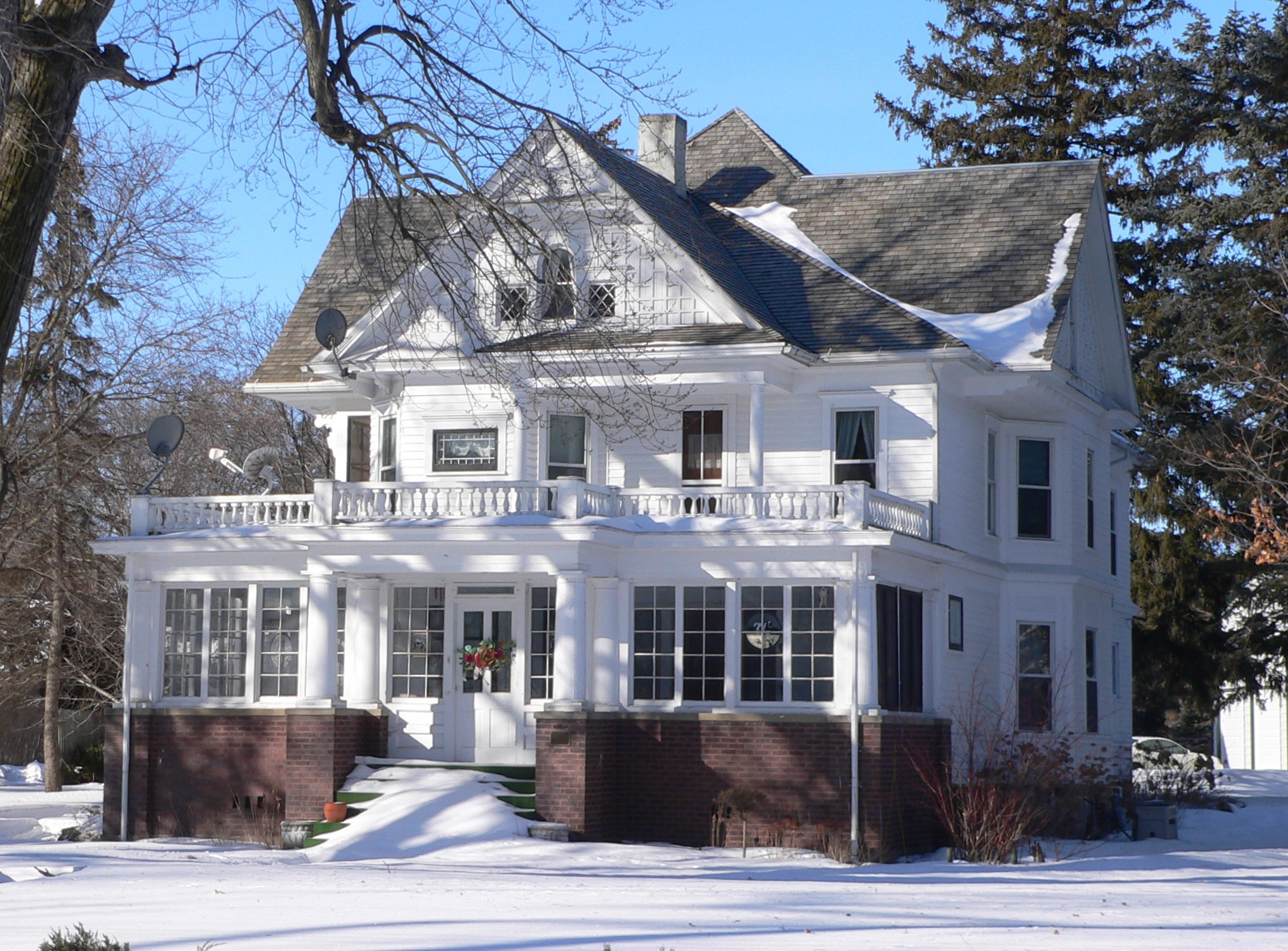
- House, seen from the northeast

- Location within Nebraska Location within the United States
- Interactive map showing the location of Warrick House
- Location: Meadow Grove, Nebraska
- Coordinates: 42.026110°N 97.737694°W
- Built: 1903
- Built by: John and Grace Warrick
- Architectural style: Queen Anne
- NRHP reference No.: 90001767
- Added to NRHP: November 28, 1990

The John Wesley and Grace Shafer Warrick House, also known as the John W. Warrick Sr. House, is a house in the southern part of the city of Meadow Grove, in the northeastern part of the state of Nebraska, in the Midwestern United States. The house was built in the Queen Anne style in 1903 by a prominent Meadow Grove businessman, who made some additions and alterations in the 1920s. The builder, and subsequently his descendants, continuously occupied it into at least the late 20th century.

The house is listed in the National Register of Historic Places, as a well-preserved example of the turn-of-the-century Queen Anne style.

== History ==
=== Meadow Grove established ===
Among the first white settlers in the area that became Meadow Grove were brothers Perry Vanado Lewis and Van Buren Lewis, who arrived in the area in 1868. In 1872, Van Buren Lewis claimed a quarter-section of land (160 acres, or 65 ha) under the 1862 Homestead Act. Perry Lewis built a dugout on an adjoining quarter-section and, in 1874, planted a grove of cottonwoods and claimed the land under the provisions of the Timber Culture Act.

In 1879, the Fremont, Elkhorn and Missouri Valley Railroad extended its tracks up the Elkhorn Valley by some 60 miles (95 km), from Wisner to Oakdale, crossing the northern part of Madison County. In 1883, Perry Lewis built a gristmill on Buffalo Creek; later that year, his son-in-law Joseph Beech built a grocery store by the gristmill, and a post office named "Gimlet" was established there. The mill attracted farmers from a wide area, and became a social as well as a commercial center.

Believing that the developing settlement needed a better location, Perry Lewis launched the town of Meadow Grove on his timber claim, platting it in 1886–87 and offering free lots to persons who would start new businesses. The store building was moved from the Gimlet site to the new town.

=== John W. Warrick ===
Among the first businesses in Meadow Grove was the Hale Warehouse Company, which dealt in grain and general merchandise. The owner, Virginia native Felix J. Hale, also owned a 400-acre (160 ha) cattle-feeding farm north of the town. In 1887, Hale offered John Wesley Warrick $100 a month to come to Meadow Grove and manage his operations.

Warrick was born in Elk Creek, Virginia, in 1858. He attended school in Elk Creek until 1878, then taught there for a year. He subsequently worked in the mercantile business, as well as serving for five years as postmaster. In 1887, he accepted Hale's offer and moved to Meadow Grove. Three years later, he married Grace Shafer, whose parents had moved from Ohio to Iowa before settling in the Meadow Grove area in 1872.

Warrick remained with Hale until 1894. In 1895, he established his own grain, lumber, and coal business. Initially, the business had no grain elevator or direct access to the railroad, and grain operations were handled through a "shovel house": grain was brought to the storage facility in wagons, shoveled into it by hand, then hand-shoveled out of storage into wagons for transport to waiting railroad cars. In 1898, Warrick built a modern elevator, with a capacity of 20,000 bushels (700 m^{3}).

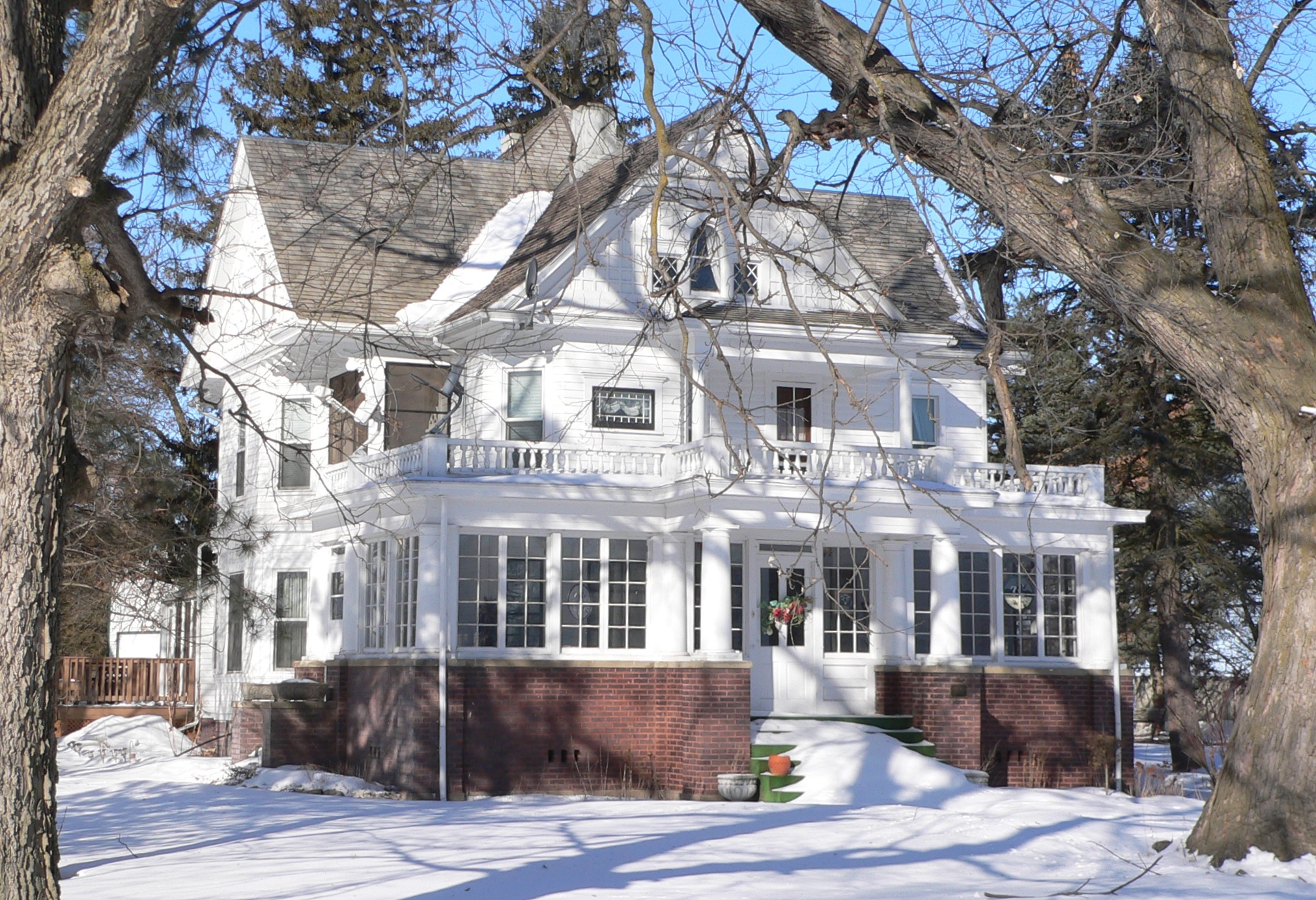
Warrick house from east-southeast

Warrick prospered and became one of Meadow Grove's most prominent citizens. He sat on the city's school board for over 20 years; served for two decades as Sunday-school superintendent at the local Methodist church; and, when the local Security Bank failed and was reorganized in 1928, he was chosen as one of the directors.

== Warrick House ==
In 1903, John and Grace Warrick built a house on a four-acre (about one-and-a-half hectares) lot at the southern edge of Meadow Grove. The two-story house was built in the Queen Anne style, at a cost of about $4,000. A carriage barn, architecturally similar to the house, was built to the southwest of the house at about the same time.

In the early 1920s, the house was raised and a finished basement constructed beneath it. A large porch was added, enclosing the entire first-floor front of the building.

In 1928, John Warrick Jr. used $5,000 given to him by his father to build a house on the property just south of the senior Warricks. Various Warrick descendants continued to occupy the property as of 1990: Robert Warrick in the main house, John Warrick Jr.'s widow in the house to the south, and John Warrick III next to the carriage barn.

In 1990, the 1903 Warrick House was listed in the National Register of Historic Places, as an "excellent" and well-preserved example of the early-20th-century Queen Anne style.

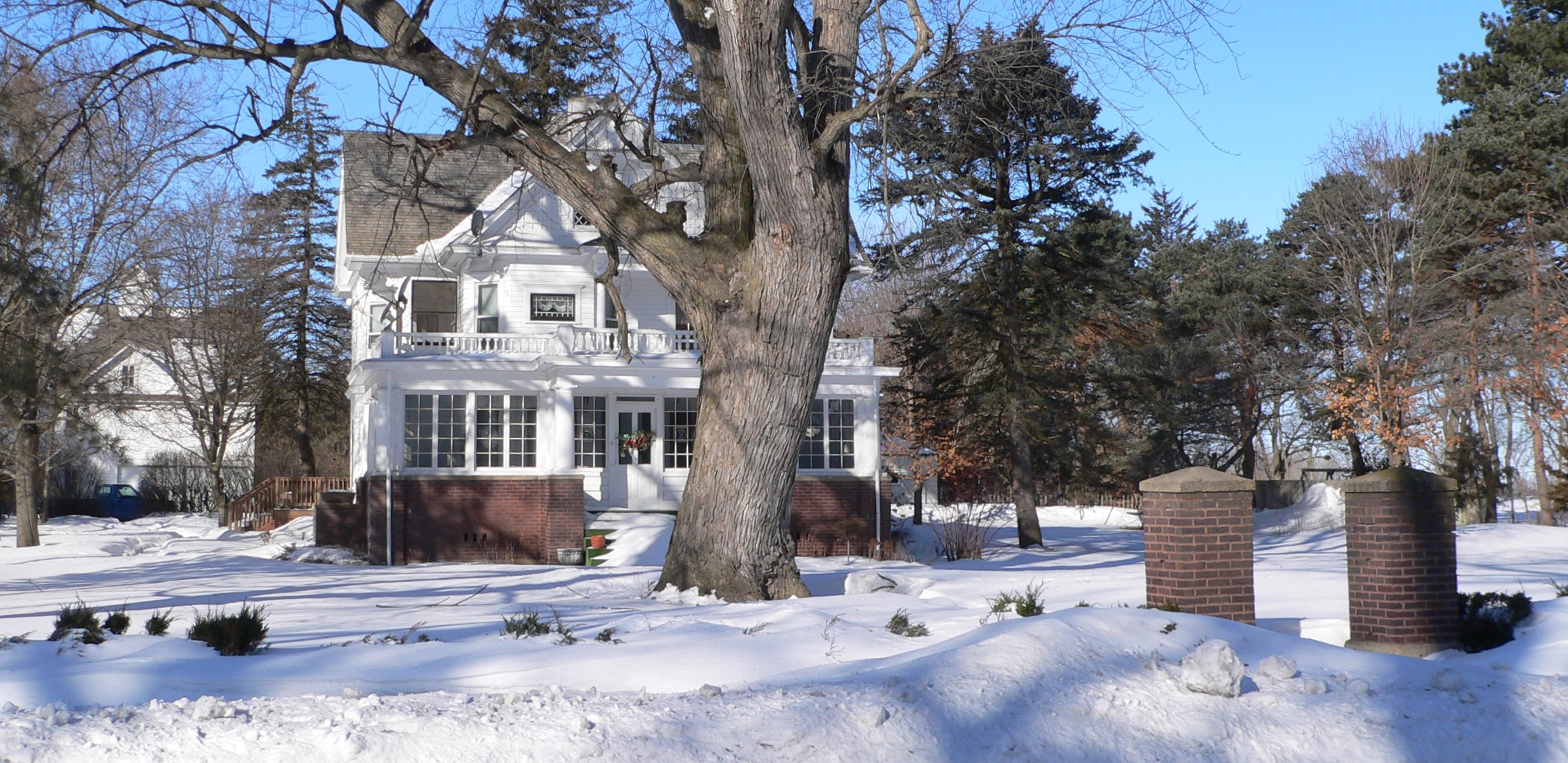
View from Fourth Street: two brick piers in right foreground, main house behind tree, carriage barn in left background

=== Description ===
The Warrick property is on the west side of Fourth Street. A line of four brick piers, installed in the 1920s and formerly connected by hedges, runs along Fourth.

The house is set in the midst of conifers and deciduous trees, including some that John Warrick Sr. planted at the time of the house's construction in 1903. A brick-and-wood pergola, built on the south side of the house in the 1920s, is no longer extant; nor is a goldfish pond north of the house.

The 19-room house faces eastward. It stands 2 1/2 stories tall, atop a red-brick foundation installed as a finished basement in the 1920s. For the first two decades of its existence, the house's front featured a porch that curved onto the south side, supported by classical columns. This porch was extended and enclosed in the 1920s, and a balcony with a railing of spindlework supports constructed atop it.

Originally, the rear (west) entrance of the house led through an enclosed porch. In 1988, a greenhouse was added there.

The north and south sides of the building feature large two-story bay windows. There is a second-floor bay window above the enclosed front porch on the east side. The cross-gabled roof is steeply pitched and wood-shingled. The front (east) and south gables are supported by classical columns.

The interior of the house was finished in a variety of woods. Floors are solid oak throughout. On the first floor are bookshelves, a trestle table, and a writing desk made of walnut taken from trees planted in the yard. As of 1990, many of the original interior furnishings and detailings remained.

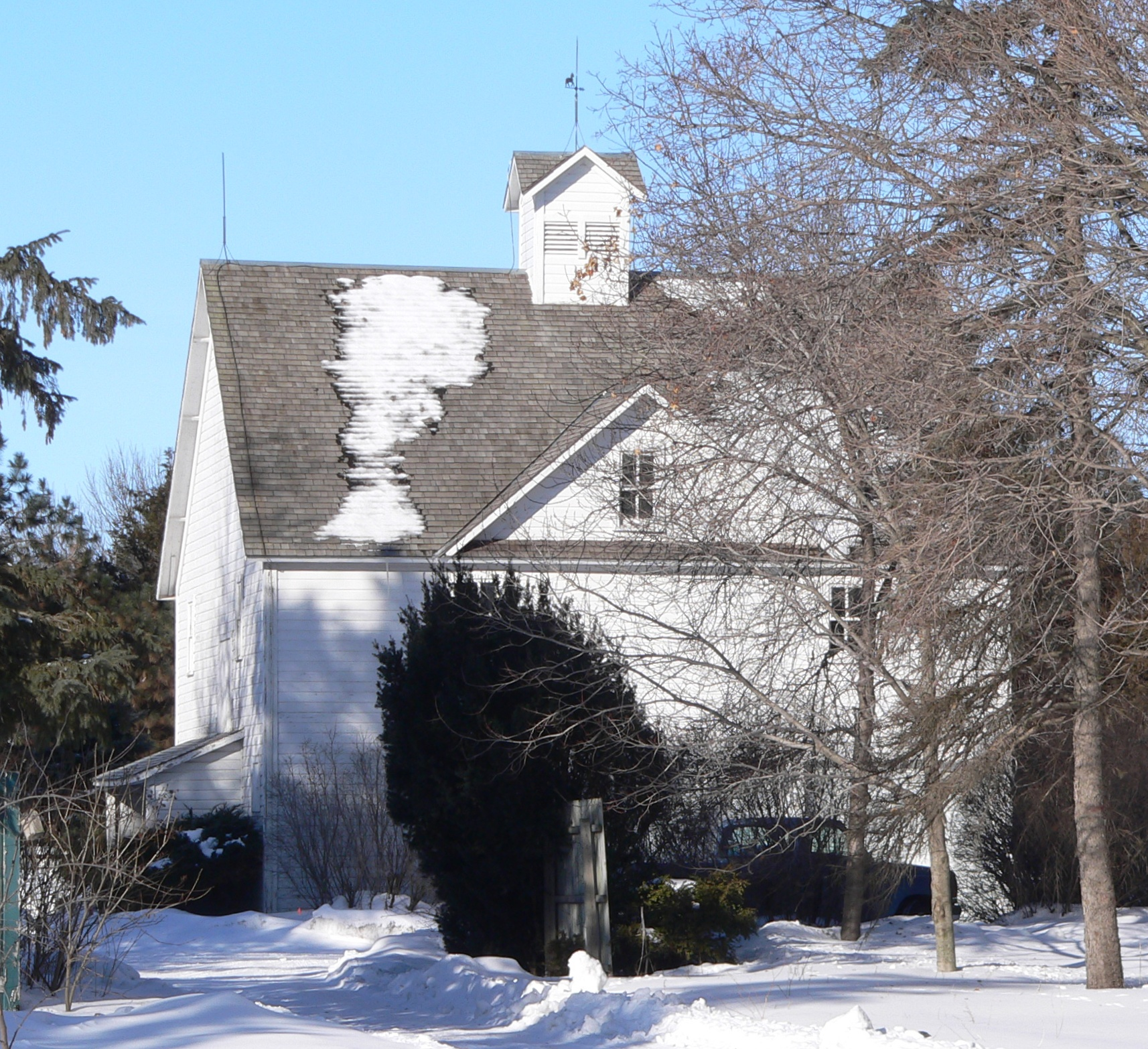
Carriage barn

A concrete curbed driveway runs westward from Fourth Street to the carriage barn southwest of the house. Built in about 1903, the barn was later converted to a garage. Its architectural style complements that of the house. The steeply pitched cross-gabled roof is topped with a square cupola; there are windows in the lower gable ends.
