= Grand Theater (Norfolk, Nebraska) =

- U.S. National Register of Historic Places
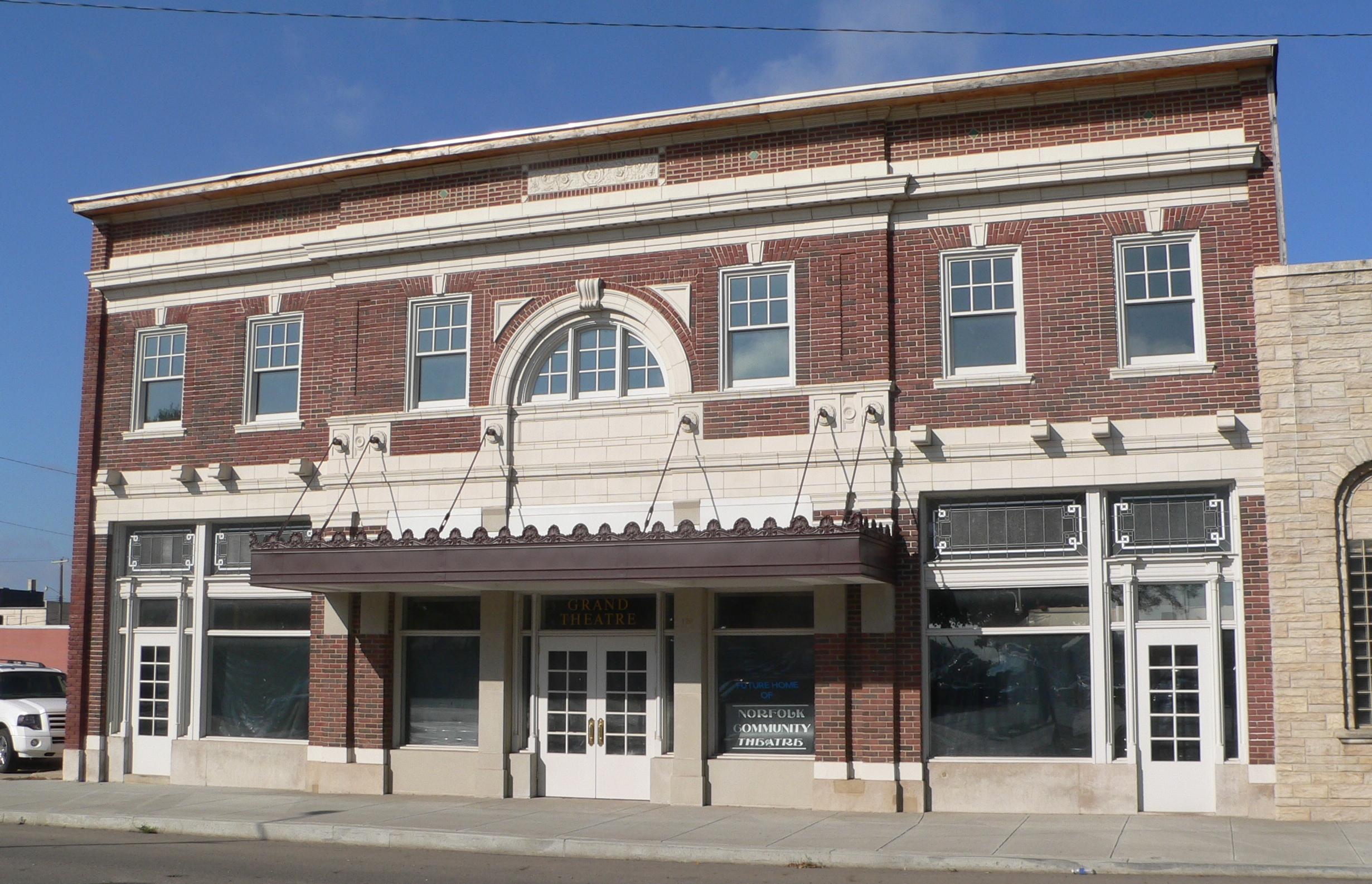

- Location within Nebraska Location within the United States
- Location: 120 S. 3rd St., Norfolk, Nebraska
- Coordinates: 42.0318115°N 97.410386°W
- Area: less than one acre
- Built: 1920
- Architectural style: Commercial
- NRHP reference No.: 13000677
- Added to NRHP: September 4, 2013

The Grand Theater in Norfolk in Madison County, Nebraska was built in 1920, had a seating capacity of 1,081, and cost about $80,000 to construct. It was listed on the National Register of Historic Places in 2013.

It was the city of Norfolk's first purpose-built movie theater when constructed in 1920.

The theater was closed during 1930–34, perhaps as result of the 1927 opening of the opulent Granada Theater, with an auditorium seating 1,100.

The theater was available for sale in February 2017.
