= Newman Grove, Nebraska =

City in Platte County, Nebraska, United States

- City
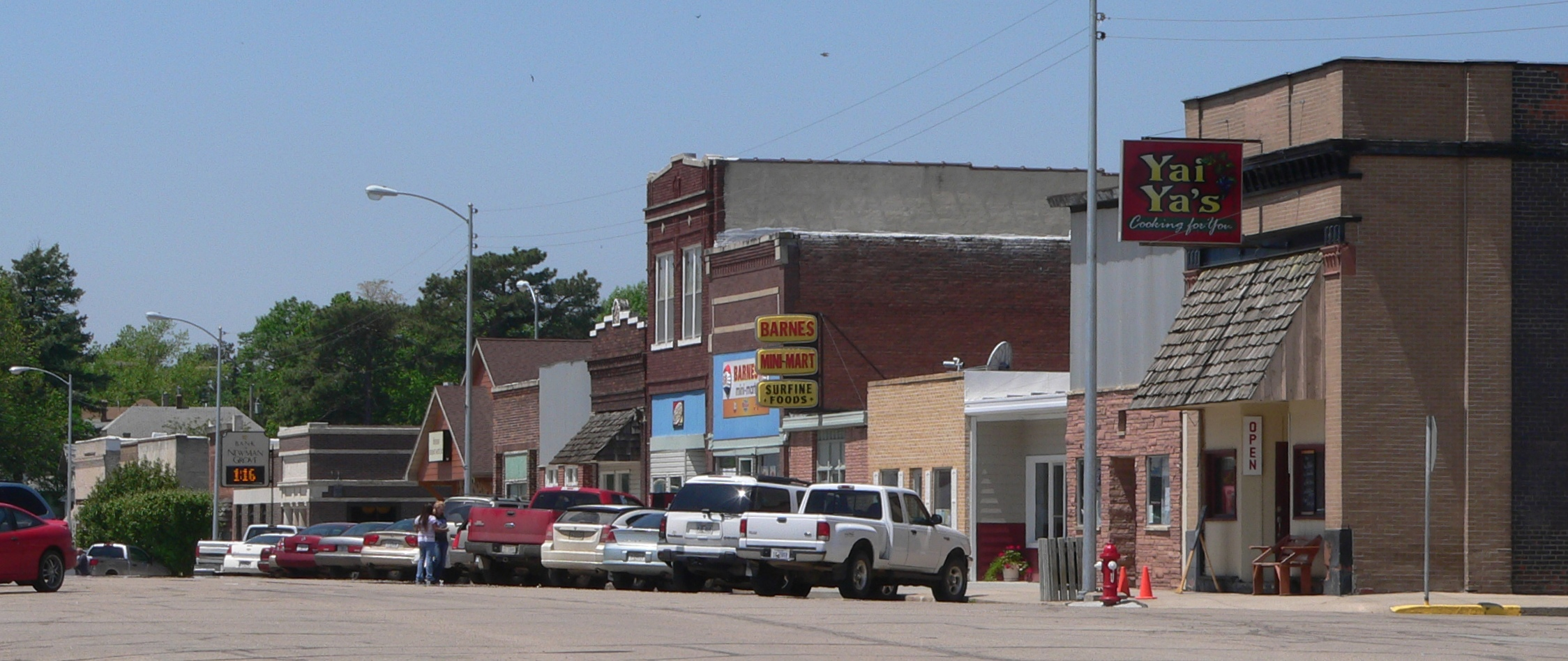
- Downtown Newman Grove: north side of Hale Avenue, May 2010

- Location in Madison County and the state of Nebraska
- Coordinates: 41°44′49″N 97°46′36″W
- Country: United States
- State: Nebraska
- Counties: Madison, Platte

Area
  - Total: 0.54 sq mi (1.41 km^{2})
  - Land: 0.54 sq mi (1.41 km^{2})
  - Water: 0 sq mi (0.00 km^{2})
- Elevation: 1,745 ft (532 m)

Population (2020)
  - Total: 667
  - Density: 1,223.6/sq mi (472.45/km^{2})
- Time zone: UTC-6 (Central (CST))
  - Summer (DST): UTC-5 (CDT)
- ZIP code: 68758
- Area code: 402
- FIPS code: 31-34230
- GNIS feature ID: 838343
- Website: cityofnewmangrove.com

Newman Grove is a city in Madison and Platte counties in Nebraska, United States. The population was 667 at the 2020 census.

The Madison County portion of Newman Grove is part of the Norfolk Micropolitan Statistical Area.

== History ==
Newman Grove was platted in 1887 when the Fremont, Elkhorn and Missouri Valley Railroad was extended to that point. It was named for a grove of trees nearby planted by Newman Warren.

== Geography ==
Newman Grove is in southwestern Madison County, with a small portion extending south into Platte County. Nebraska Highway 45 passes through the city as 8th Street; the highway leads north 23 miles (37 km) to Tilden and south 3 miles (5 km) to its terminus at Nebraska Highway 91. Madison, the Madison county seat, is 22 miles (35 km) to the northeast via Highways 45 and 32.

According to the U.S. Census Bureau, Newman Grove has a total area of 0.55 square miles (1.42 km^{2}), all land. Shell Creek runs along the northern edge of the city, flowing southeast to join the Platte River east of Schuyler.

== Demographics ==
Historical population
Census	Pop.	Note	%±
1890	330		—
1900	696		110.9%
1910	850		22.1%
1920	1,260		48.2%
1930	1,146		−9.0%
1940	1,036		−9.6%
1950	1,004		−3.1%
1960	880		−12.4%
1970	863		−1.9%
1980	930		7.8%
1990	787		−15.4%
2000	797		1.3%
2010	721		−9.5%
2020	667		−7.5%
U.S. Decennial Census

=== 2010 census ===
As of the census of 2010, there were 721 people, 320 households, and 183 families residing in the city. The population density was 1,310.9 inhabitants per square mile (506.1/km^{2}). There were 382 housing units at an average density of 694.5 per square mile (268.1/km^{2}). The racial makeup of the city was 91.1% White, 0.3% Native American, 0.7% Asian, 7.1% from other races, and 0.8% from two or more races. Hispanic or Latino of any race were 10.1% of the population.

There were 320 households, of which 25.3% had children under the age of 18 living with them, 46.6% were married couples living together, 7.8% had a female householder with no husband present, 2.8% had a male householder with no wife present, and 42.8% were non-families. 38.8% of all households were made up of individuals, and 22.8% had someone living alone who was 65 years of age or older. The average household size was 2.15 and the average family size was 2.86.

The median age in the city was 50.1 years. 21.8% of residents were under the age of 18; 3.6% were between the ages of 18 and 24; 16.7% were from 25 to 44; 32.8% were from 45 to 64; and 25.2% were 65 years of age or older. The gender makeup of the city was 46.6% male and 53.4% female.

=== 2000 census ===
As of the census of 2000, there were 797 people, 323 households, and 190 families residing in the city. The population density was 1,567.9 people per square mile (605.4 people/km^{2}). There were 372 housing units at an average density of 731.8 per square mile (282.5/km^{2}). The racial makeup of the city was 90.72% White, 0.25% Native American, 1.00% Asian, 7.53% from other races, and 0.50% from two or more races. Hispanic or Latino of any race were 13.17% of the population.

There were 323 households, out of which 27.9% had children under the age of 18 living with them, 52.3% were married couples living together, 4.0% had a female householder with no husband present, and 40.9% were non-families. 38.4% of all households were made up of individuals, and 24.5% had someone living alone who was 65 years of age or older. The average household size was 2.29 and the average family size was 3.10.

The median age was 43 years. The population distribution was: 24.8% under the age of 18, 4.8% from 18 to 24, 22.0% from 25 to 44, 20.6% from 45 to 64, and 27.9% aged 65 or older. For every 100 females, there were 89.8 males. For every 100 females age 18 and over, there were 80.4 males.

As of 2000 the median income for a household in the city was $30,329, and the median income for a family was $39,653. Males had a median income of $26,786 versus $20,000 for females. The per capita income for the city was $16,247. About 3.5% of families and 11.9% of the population were below the poverty line, including 18.5% of those under age 18 and 11.4% of those age 65 or over.

== Education ==
Newman Grove Public Schools is a K-12 public school district that serves the area.

== Religion ==
There are five churches in town: Newman Grove United Methodist Church, Trinity Lutheran Church, Zion Shell Creek Salem Church, Zion Evangelical Lutheran Church, and Fellowship Bible Church.

== See also ==
- List of municipalities in Nebraska
