= Elkhorn Valley Schools =

School district in Nebraska, United States

Address
- 601 South Madison Street Tilden, Nebraska, 68781; United States

District information
- Type: Public
- Grades: PreK–12
- NCES District ID: 3100025

Students and staff
- Students: 443 (2020–2021)
- Teachers: 37.08 (FTE)
- Staff: 37.27 (FTE)
- Student–teacher ratio: 11.95:1

Other information
- Website: www.elkhornvalleyschools.org

Elkhorn Valley Schools is located in Tilden, in northeastern Nebraska, United States.

== District statistics ==
The district is a Class 3 school and categorized as a C2 class size. The district houses approximately 300 students in a K-12 campus location. The staff consists of 33 teachers, 9 paraprofessionals, 2 administrators and 15 classified personnel.
