= Mathewson–Gerecke House =

Historic house in Nebraska, United States

- U.S. National Register of Historic Places
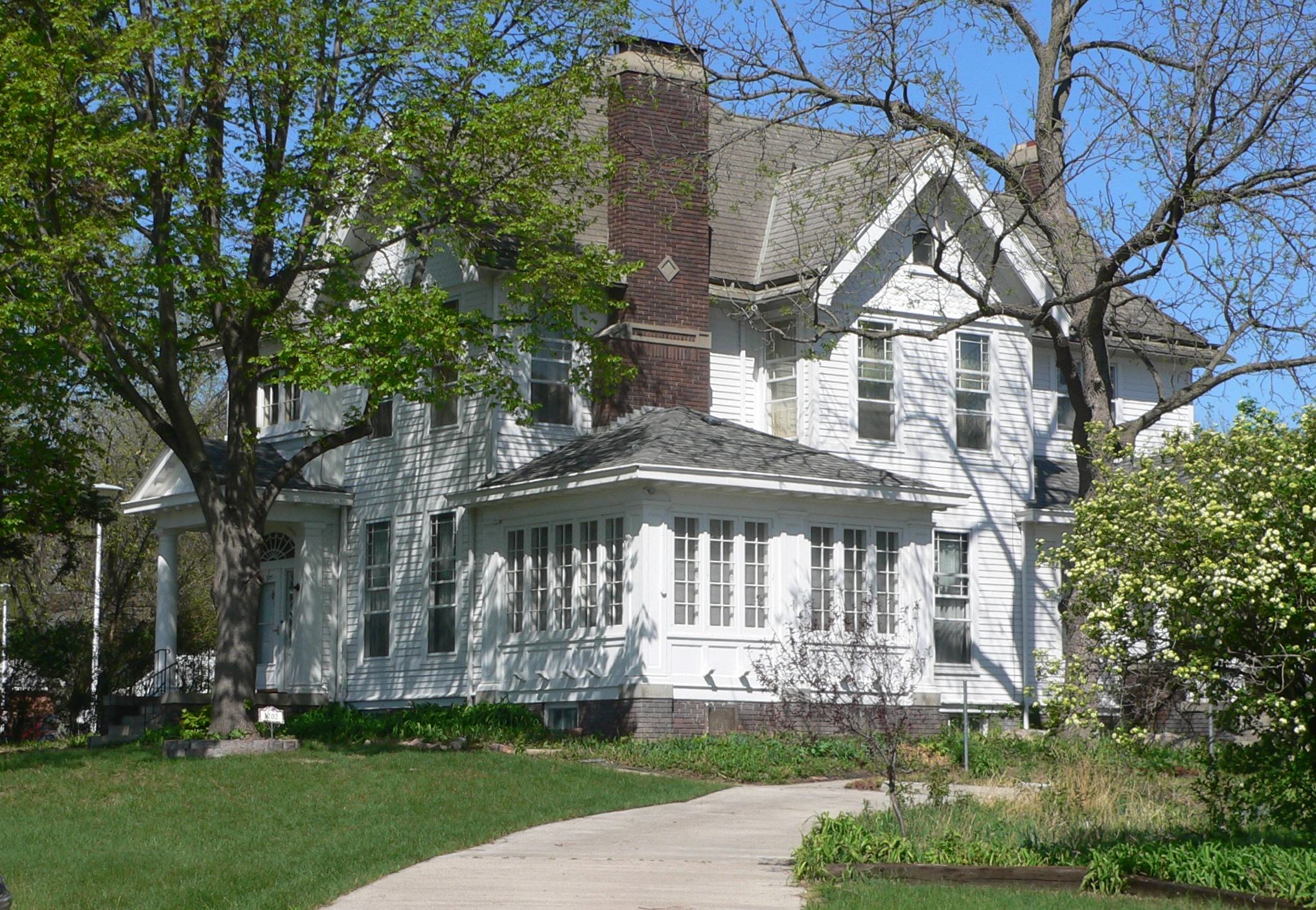

- Location within Nebraska Location within the United States
- Location: 1202 W. Norfolk Ave., Norfolk, Nebraska
- Coordinates: 42.03318°N 97.42373°W
- Area: less than one acre
- Architectural style: Queen Anne
- NRHP reference No.: 12000105
- Added to NRHP: March 12, 2012

The Mathewson–Gerecke House in Norfolk, Nebraska was built in 1884. It was listed on the National Register of Historic Places in 2012.

It is a two-story Queen Anne-style house. It was remodelled in c.1925, at which time a sunroom on the east side was added, and front and rear porches were replaced with Classical porticos.

It was home of Charles Payson Mathewson (1848-1941), who eventually served as speaker of the House of the state of Nebraska, and served as a bank president, and fled in a scandal, after stealing funds.

It was later home of Herman Gerecke.
