= KUSO =

- Albion, Nebraska; United States
- Broadcast area: Norfolk, Nebraska; Columbus, Nebraska
- Frequency: 92.7 MHz
- Branding: US92

Programming
- Format: Country music

Ownership
- Owner: Flood Communications, L.L.C.
- Sister stations: KNEN, KNEN-LD

Technical information
- Licensing authority: FCC
- Facility ID: 82844
- Class: C2
- ERP: 50,000 watts
- HAAT: 150 meters (490 ft)
- Transmitter coordinates: 41°49′50.00″N 97°41′13.00″W
- Translator: 107.5 K298AG (Norfolk)

Links
- Public license information: Public file; LMS
- Webcast: Listen live
- Website: us92.com

KUSO (92.7 FM) is a radio station licensed to Albion, Nebraska, United States. The station airs a country music format and is currently owned by Flood Communications, L.L.C.

Previous logo
