= Norfolk micropolitan area, Nebraska =

Norfolk micropolitan area
- Micropolitan statistical area
- Norfolk, NE Micropolitan Statistical Area
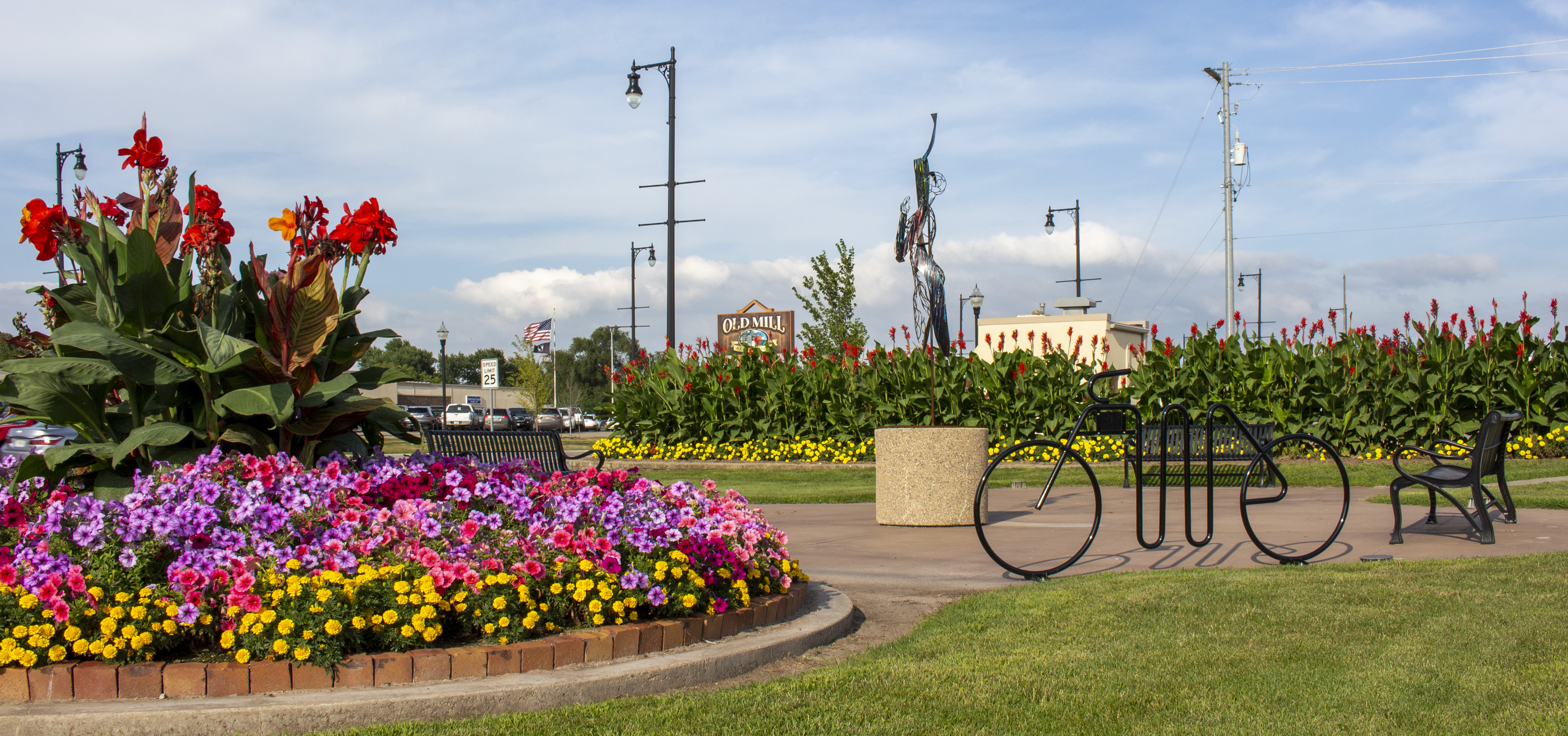
- Downtown Norfolk
Interactive Map of Norfolk, NE μSA
City of Norfolk
Norfolk, NE μSA
- Country: United States
- State: Nebraska
- Largest city: Norfolk
- Time zone: UTC−6 (CST)
  - Summer (DST): UTC−5 (CDT)

The Norfolk micropolitan statistical area, as defined by the United States Census Bureau, is an area consisting of three counties in Nebraska, anchored by the city of Norfolk.

At the 2000 census, the μSA had a population of 49,538 (though a July 1, 2009, estimate placed the population at 48,000).

== Counties ==
- Madison
- Pierce
- Stanton

== Communities ==
- Places with 20,000 or more inhabitants
  - Norfolk (Principal City)
- Places with 1,000 to 5,000 inhabitants
  - Battle Creek
  - Tilden (partial)
  - Madison
  - Pierce
  - Plainview
  - Stanton
- Places with less than 1,000 inhabitants
  - Foster
  - Hadar
  - McLean
  - Meadow Grove
  - Newman Grove (partial)
  - Osmond
  - Pilger

== Demographics ==
At the 2000 census, there were 49,538 people, 18,712 households and 12,819 families residing within the μSA. The racial makeup of the μSA was 93.21% White, 0.73% African American, 0.96% Native American, 0.34% Asian, 0.03% Pacific Islander, 3.82% from other races, and 0.92% from two or more races. Hispanic or Latino of any race were 6.55% of the population.

The median household income in the μSA was $34,907 and the median family income was $42,204. Males had a median income of $28,388 compared with $20,336 for females. The per capita income for the μSA was $16,098.

== See also ==
- Nebraska census statistical areas
