= Emerick, Nebraska =

Unincorporated community in Nebraska, United States

- Unincorporated community
- Location within Nebraska Location within the United States
- Coordinates: 41.9°N 97.7°W
- Country: United States
- State: Nebraska
- County: Madison

Emerick is an unincorporated community in Madison County, Nebraska, United States.

== History ==
A post office was established at Emerick in 1873, and remained in operation until it was discontinued in 1920. The community was named for John Emerick, a pioneer settler.
