= Meadow Grove, Nebraska =

- Village
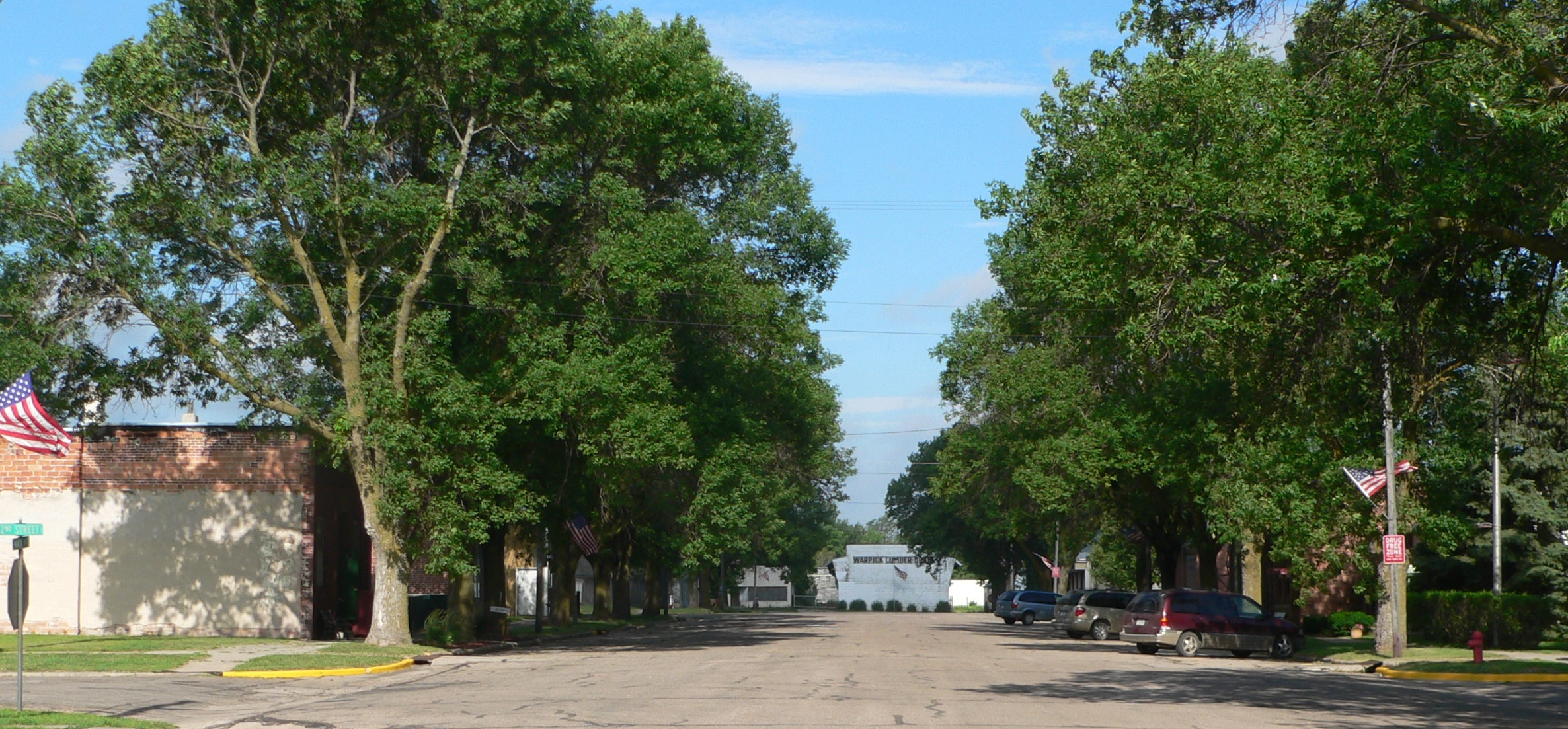
- Downtown Meadow Grove: looking west along Main Avenue

- Location in Madison County and the state of Nebraska
- Coordinates: 42°01′44″N 97°44′10″W
- Country: United States
- State: Nebraska
- County: Madison

Area
  - Total: 0.31 sq mi (0.79 km^{2})
  - Land: 0.31 sq mi (0.79 km^{2})
  - Water: 0 sq mi (0.00 km^{2})
- Elevation: 1,637 ft (499 m)

Population (2020)
  - Total: 287
  - Density: 940.6/sq mi (363.18/km^{2})
- Time zone: UTC-6 (Central (CST))
  - Summer (DST): UTC-5 (CDT)
- ZIP code: 68752
- Area code: 402
- FIPS code: 31-31465
- GNIS feature ID: 2399300

Meadow Grove is a village in Madison County, Nebraska, United States. It is part of the Norfolk Micropolitan Statistical Area. The population of Meadow Grove was 287 at the 2020 census.

== History ==
Meadow Grove was platted in 1886. It was named from a grove of trees in a meadow near the original town site.

== Geography ==
Meadow Grove is in northwestern Madison County, mostly on the south side of U.S. Route 275, which leads west 5 miles (8 km) to Tilden and east 16 miles (26 km) to Norfolk, the largest city in the county.

According to the U.S. Census Bureau, the village has a total area of 0.31 square miles (0.80 km^{2}), all land. The Elkhorn River passes about 1 mile (1.6 km) north of the village.

=== Climate ===
This climatic region is typified by large seasonal temperature differences, with warm to hot (and often humid) summers and cold (sometimes severely cold) winters. According to the Köppen Climate Classification system, Meadow Grove has a humid continental climate, abbreviated "Dfa" on climate maps.

== Demographics ==
Historical population
Census	Pop.	Note	%±
1900	237		—
1910	388		63.7%
1920	449		15.7%
1930	483		7.6%
1940	479		−0.8%
1950	461		−3.8%
1960	430		−6.7%
1970	372		−13.5%
1980	400		7.5%
1990	332		−17.0%
2000	311		−6.3%
2010	301		−3.2%
2020	287		−4.7%
U.S. Decennial Census

=== 2010 census ===
As of the census of 2010, there were 301 people, 134 households, and 76 families residing in the village. The population density was 971.0 inhabitants per square mile (374.9/km^{2}). There were 154 housing units at an average density of 496.8 per square mile (191.8/km^{2}). The racial makeup of the village was 95.7% White, 0.3% African American, 1.3% Native American, 1.7% from other races, and 1.0% from two or more races. Hispanic or Latino of any race were 3.7% of the population.

There were 134 households, of which 23.1% had children under the age of 18 living with them, 45.5% were married couples living together, 7.5% had a female householder with no husband present, 3.7% had a male householder with no wife present, and 43.3% were non-families. 38.1% of all households were made up of individuals, and 14.1% had someone living alone who was 65 years of age or older. The average household size was 2.25 and the average family size was 2.91.

The median age in the village was 39.8 years. 21.9% of residents were under the age of 18; 6.9% were between the ages of 18 and 24; 26.3% were from 25 to 44; 30.2% were from 45 to 64; and 14.6% were 65 years of age or older. The gender makeup of the village was 52.2% male and 47.8% female.

=== 2000 census ===
As of the census of 2000, there were 311 people, 146 households, and 88 families residing in the village. The population density was 1,023.8 inhabitants per square mile (395.3/km^{2}). There were 162 housing units at an average density of 533.3 per square mile (205.9/km^{2}). The racial makeup of the village was 95.18% White, 0.32% African American, 2.57% Native American, 0.32% Asian, 0.96% from other races, and 0.64% from two or more races. Hispanic or Latino of any race were 1.93% of the population.

There were 146 households, out of which 23.3% had children under the age of 18 living with them, 51.4% were married couples living together, 6.2% had a female householder with no husband present, and 39.7% were non-families. 39.7% of all households were made up of individuals, and 22.6% had someone living alone who was 65 years of age or older. The average household size was 2.13 and the average family size was 2.85.

In the village, the population was spread out, with 21.5% under the age of 18, 9.3% from 18 to 24, 24.4% from 25 to 44, 21.5% from 45 to 64, and 23.2% who were 65 years of age or older. The median age was 43 years. For every 100 females, there were 93.2 males. For every 100 females age 18 and over, there were 93.7 males.

As of 2000 the median income for a household in the village was $26,042, and the median income for a family was $35,417. Males had a median income of $26,563 versus $20,000 for females. The per capita income for the village was $16,259. About 16.0% of families and 21.3% of the population were below the poverty line, including 42.4% of those under age 18 and 15.1% of those age 65 or over.
