= Frances Louise Long =

American plant ecologist

Frances Louise Long (born September 7, 1885, in Madison, Nebraska, died March 17, 1946, in Santa Barbara, California) was an American plant ecologist who worked in the fields of plant physiology and pollination.

== Biography ==
=== Early life ===
Frances Long was born on September 7, 1885, in Madison, Nebraska.

=== Education ===
She received a Bachelor of Arts and a Bachelor of Science in 1906, from the University of Nebraska system. In 1914, she earned a Master of Arts from the University of Minnesota. In 1917, she completed a Doctor of Philosophy degree from the same institution.

=== Career ===
Long conducted research at prestigious institutions including: Carnegie Institution for Science where she began as a research associate studying plant science in 1917, the Alpine Laboratory at Tucson, and the Coastal Laboratory of Santa Barbara.

== Distinctions ==
- American Association for the Advancement of Science - Member
- Ecological Society of America - Member
- Botanical Society of America - Member
- American Society of Plant Physiologists - Member

== Publications ==
Long's work has been featured in over 60 publications including:

- Rubber-Content of North American Plants (co-authored with Harvey M. Hall) - Carnegie Institution of Washington, 1921, Publication No.313, Press of Gibson Brothers Inc., Washington, D.C.

== See also ==
- American Association for the Advancement of Science
- Carnegie Institution for Science
