= KNEN =

- Norfolk, Nebraska; United States
- Frequency: 94.7 MHz
- Branding: The New 94 Rock!

Programming
- Format: Classic rock
- Affiliations: United Stations Radio Networks

Ownership
- Owner: Red Beacon Communications, LLC
- Sister stations: KNEN-LD, KUSO

History
- First air date: 1979

Technical information
- Facility ID: 9954
- Class: C1
- ERP: 100,000 watts
- HAAT: 164.2 meters
- Transmitter coordinates: 41°55′28.00″N 97°36′22.00″W

Links
- Webcast: Listen Live
- Website: Official Website

KNEN (94.7 FM) is a radio station broadcasting a classic rock format. Licensed to Norfolk, Nebraska, United States, the station is currently owned by Red Beacon Communications, LLC.

== History ==
KNEN was founded by Gene Koehn in 1979 as a Top 40 radio station. Koehn was a native of Norfolk, Nebraska, and started his radio career with Norfolk's WJAG radio. He left WJAG, and Norfolk, over a wage dispute. Koehn was a top salesman with the station and was successful enough that he was earning nearly as much money as the station manager. The station manager took umbrage with this and called Koehn in to advise him that there would be changes in how he was paid. Koehn did not take this news well and left the station. He vowed he would return and start a new station in town, and did just that.

On October 8, 2015, KNEN changed its format to news/classic hits, branded as "94.7 News Channel Nebraska" or "NCN 94.7". The branding tied in with the local TV network News Channel Nebraska, which with it shares an owner.

On March 26, 2018, KNEN changed its format from news/classic hits to classic rock, branded as "The New 94 Rock".
