= Nebraska Highway 45 =

State highway in Nebraska, U.S.

State Highway 45

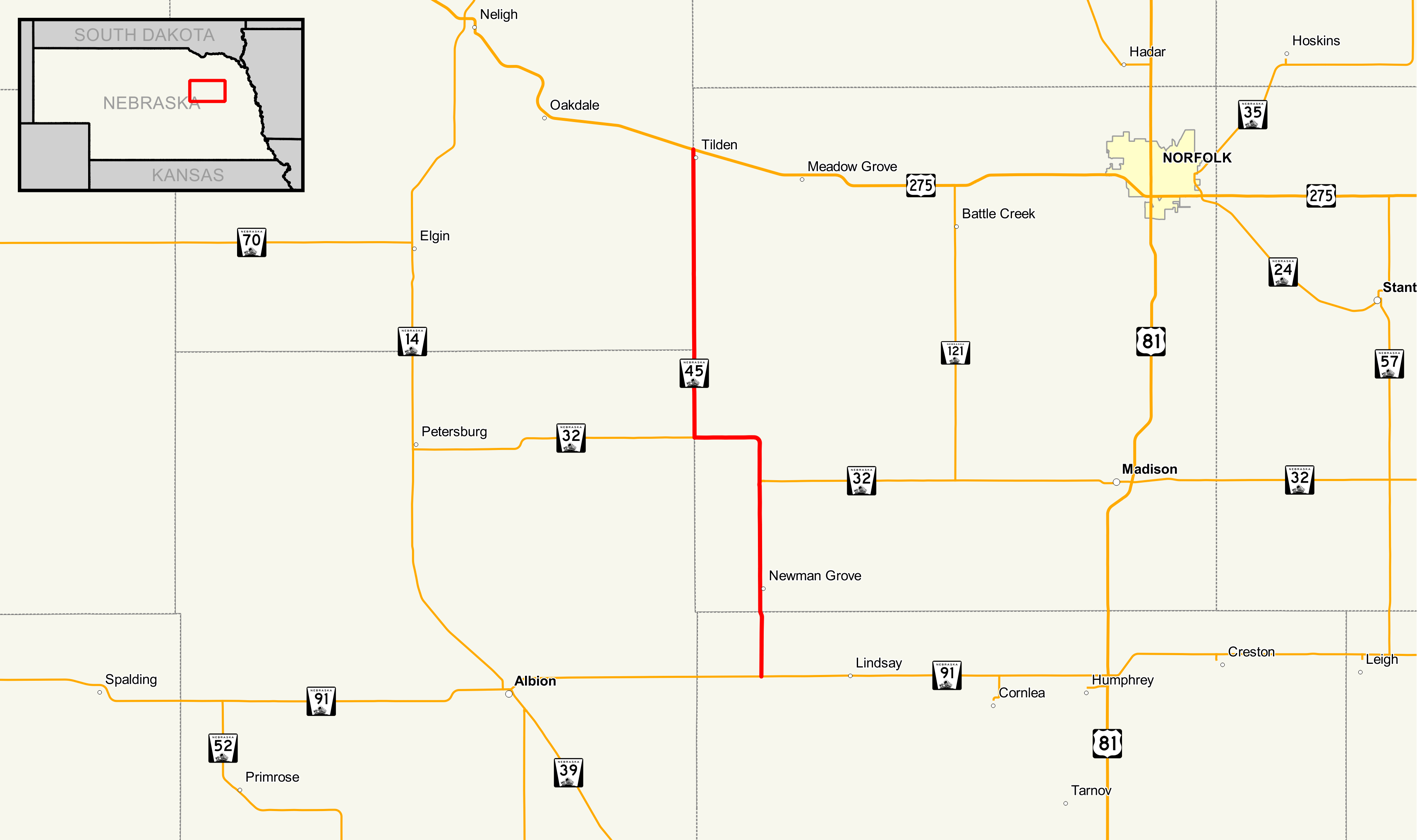
- Nebraska Highway 45 highlighted in red

Route information
- Maintained by NDOT
- Length: 27.08 mi (43.58 km)
- Existed: 1974–present

Major junctions
- South end: NE 91 south of Newman Grove
- NE 32 north of Newman Grove
- North end: US 275 in Tilden

Location
- Country: United States
- State: Nebraska
- Counties: Platte, Madison, Boone, Antelope

Highway system
- Nebraska State Highway System; Interstate; US; State; Link; Spur; State Spurs; Recreation
| ← N-44 | → N-46 |

Nebraska Highway 45 is a highway in Nebraska. It runs in a south-to-north direction for 27 miles (43 km). It has a southern terminus at Nebraska Highway 91 south of Newman Grove. It has a northern terminus in Tilden at an intersection with U.S. Highway 275.

== Route description ==
Nebraska Highway 45 begins at Nebraska Highway 91 south of Newman Grove. It goes north through Newman Grove and then meets Nebraska Highway 32. The two highways overlap for 5 miles (8.0 km), going north and west to the border between Madison County and Boone County. At the border, Highway 45 turns north and separates from Highway 32. Highway 45 continues north, serving as the west border of Madison County and the east border of Boone County and Antelope County, ending in Tilden at U.S. Highway 275.

== Major intersections ==
| County | Location | mi | km | Destinations | Notes |
|---|---|---|---|---|---|
| Platte | | 0.00 | 0.00 | N-91 | Southern terminus |
| Madison | | 8.78 | 14.13 | L-59B east to N-32 east | |
| Madison | | 8.99 | 14.47 | N-32 east | South end of NE 32 overlap |
| Madison–Boone county line | | 13.90 | 22.37 | N-32 west | North end of NE 32 overlap |
| Madison–Antelope county line | Tilden | 27.08 | 43.58 | US 275 (Front Street) | Northern terminus |
1.000 mi = 1.609 km; 1.000 km = 0.621 mi: Concurrency terminus
