= Nebraska Highway 32 =

State highway in Nebraska, U.S.

State Highway 32

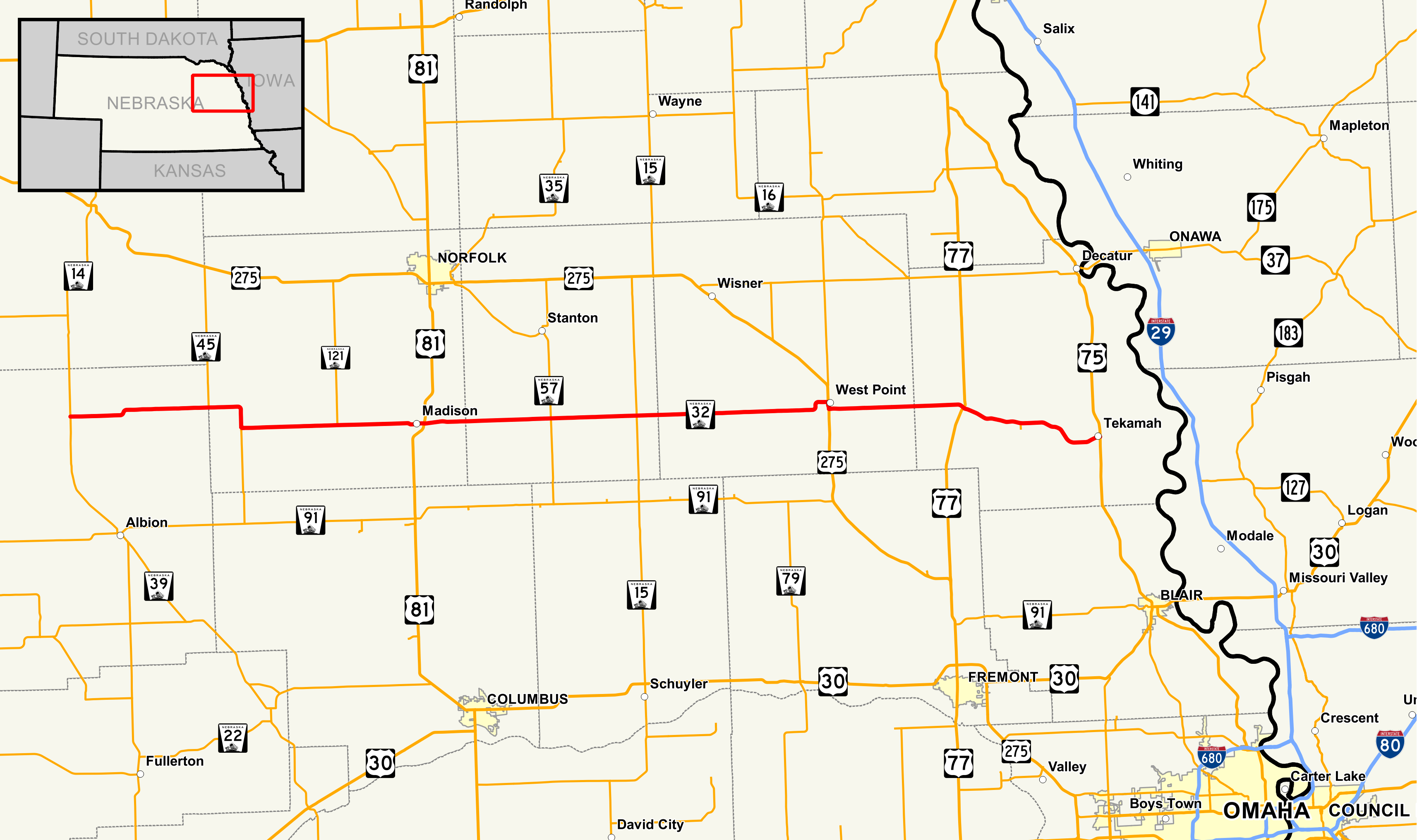
- Nebraska Highway 32 highlighted in red

Route information
- Maintained by NDOT
- Length: 100.93 mi (162.43 km)
- Existed: 1925–present

Major junctions
- West end: N-14 in Petersburg
- US 81 east of Madison; N-15 west of Aloys; US 275 in West Point; US 77 in Oakland
- East end: US 75 at Tekamah

Location
- Country: United States
- State: Nebraska
- Counties: Boone, Madison, Stanton, Cuming, Burt

Highway system
- Nebraska State Highway System; Interstate; US; State; Link; Spur; State Spurs; Recreation
← N-31	→ N-33

Nebraska Highway 32 is a United States highway in Nebraska. It runs for 101 miles (163 km) through east central and eastern Nebraska. Its western terminus is at Nebraska Highway 14 in Petersburg. Its eastern terminus is at U.S. Highway 75 in Tekamah.

== Route description ==
Nebraska Highway 32 begins in Petersburg at Nebraska Highway 14. It goes east from there through farmland and at the border separating Boone County and Madison County, it meets Nebraska Highway 45. They overlap for 5 miles (8.0 km), then NE 32 turns east near Newman Grove. It turns east, meets Nebraska Highway 121, then enters Madison. At the east end of Madison, NE 32 meets U.S. Highway 81. It continues east to West Point, Nebraska, meeting Nebraska Highway 57 and Nebraska Highway 15 between Madison and West Point. At West Point, NE 32 meets U.S. Highway 275 and they overlap in West Point. After separating from US 275, NE 32 turns east again and meets U.S. Highway 77 near Oakland. It continues east again and ends in Tekamah at U.S. Highway 75.

== Major intersections ==
County	Location	mi	km	Destinations	Notes
Boone	Petersburg	0.00	0.00	N-14 (Front Street)	Western terminus
Boone		13.17	21.20	N-45 north	West end of NE 45 overlap
Madison		18.08	29.10	N-45 south	East end of NE 45 overlap
Madison		18.29	29.43	L-59B south	
Madison		27.10	43.61	N-121 north (546th Avenue)	
Madison	Madison	35.31	56.83	US 81	
Stanton		47.17	75.91	N-57 (566th Road)	
Stanton		55.21	88.85	N-15 (574th Avenue)	
Cuming	West Point	73.63	118.50	US 275 north (South Lincoln Streer)	West end of US 275 overlap
Cuming	West Point	74.29	119.56	US 275 south (17th Road)	East end of US 275 overlap
Burt	Oakland	86.99	140.00	US 77 (Charde Avenue)	
Burt	Craig	92.63	149.07	S-11A south (County Road 21)	
Burt	Tekamah	100.93	162.43	US 75 (South 13th Street)	Eastern terminus
1.000 mi = 1.609 km; 1.000 km = 0.621 mi: Concurrency terminus
