= Tilden, Nebraska =

City in Antelope and Madison counties in Nebraska, United States

- City
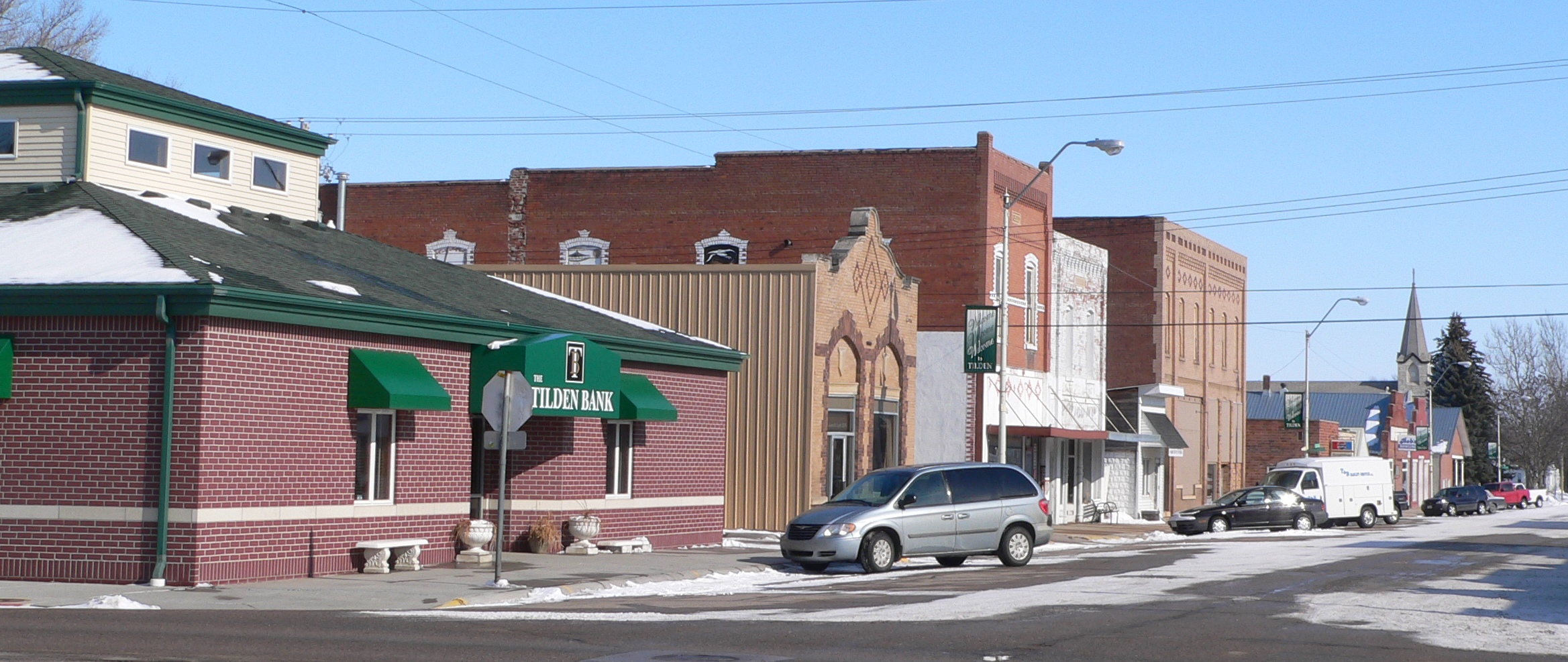
- North side of 2nd Street in Tilden

- Logo

- Location in Madison County and the state of Nebraska
- Coordinates: 42°02′37″N 97°49′55″W
- Country: United States
- State: Nebraska
- Counties: Madison, Antelope

Area
  - Total: 0.78 sq mi (2.01 km^{2})
  - Land: 0.78 sq mi (2.01 km^{2})
  - Water: 0 sq mi (0.00 km^{2})
- Elevation: 1,683 ft (513 m)

Population (2020)
  - Total: 992
  - Density: 1,279.1/sq mi (493.88/km^{2})
- Time zone: UTC-6 (Central (CST))
  - Summer (DST): UTC-5 (CDT)
- ZIP code: 68781
- Area code: 402
- FIPS code: 31-48935
- GNIS feature ID: 838282
- Website: www.tildenne.com

Tilden is a city in Madison and Antelope counties in Nebraska, United States. The population was 992 at the 2020 census. The Madison County portion of Tilden is part of the Norfolk Micropolitan Statistical Area.

== History ==
Tilden was originally called "Burnett", under which name it was laid out by the railroad in 1880. It was incorporated as Burnett in 1885, but the U.S. Post Office officially changed the name of the village in 1887, after presidential candidate Samuel J. Tilden, to avoid confusion with Bennet, Nebraska. Tilden was incorporated as a city in 1919.

== Geography ==
The city is located on the boundary between Madison and Antelope counties, with two-thirds of the city in northwestern Madison County and the remainder in Antelope. U.S. Highway 275 passes through the city, leading east 22 miles (35 km) to Norfolk, the largest city in Madison County, and northwest 13 miles (21 km) to Neligh, the Antelope county seat. Nebraska Highway 45 has its northern terminus in Tilden and leads south 23 miles (37 km) to Newman Grove.

According to the U.S. Census Bureau, Tilden has a total area of 0.78 square miles (2.02 km^{2}), all land. Giles Creek passes through the west side of the city, flowing north about a mile to the Elkhorn River, a tributary of the Platte.

Tilden was located on the Cowboy Line of the Chicago and Northwestern Railroad. The line was abandoned in 1992, and with it the antique wigwag signal that protected the main crossing in town. The abandoned line has been converted to the Cowboy Trail, running 321 miles (517 km) from Norfolk to Chadron; when complete, it will be the longest rails-to-trails line in the United States.

== Demographics ==
Historical population
Census	Pop.	Note	%±
1900	533		—
1910	901		69.0%
1920	1,101		22.2%
1930	1,106		0.5%
1940	984		−11.0%
1950	1,033		5.0%
1960	917		−11.2%
1970	947		3.3%
1980	1,012		6.9%
1990	895		−11.6%
2000	1,078		20.4%
2010	953		−11.6%
2020	992		4.1%
U.S. Decennial Census

=== 2010 census ===
At the 2010 census there were 953 people in 403 households, including 262 families, in the city. The population density was 1,287.8 inhabitants per square mile (497.2/km^{2}). There were 453 housing units at an average density of 612.2 per square mile (236.4/km^{2}). The racial makup of the city was 96.2% White, 0.4% African American, 0.2% Native American, 0.6% Asian, 1.4% from other races, and 1.2% from two or more races. Hispanic or Latino of any race were 2.2%.

Of the 403 households, 30.3% had children under the age of 18 living with them, 56.1% were married couples living together, 5.7% had a female householder with no husband present, 3.2% had a male householder with no wife present, and 35.0% were non-families. 32.5% of households were one person, and 18.1% were one person aged 65 or older. The average household size was 2.35 and the average family size was 2.98.

The median age was 38.3 years. 25.3% of residents were under the age of 18; 5.4% were between the ages of 18 and 24; 23.6% were from 25 to 44; 24.2% were from 45 to 64; and 21.3% were 65 or older. The gender makeup of the city was 49.5% male and 50.5% female.

=== 2000 census ===
At the 2000 census there were 1,078 people in 418 households, including 270 families, in the city. The population density was 1,475.5 inhabitants per square mile (569.7/km^{2}). There were 470 housing units at an average density of 643.3 per square mile (248.4/km^{2}). The racial makup of the city was 95.55% White, 0.09% African American, 0.93% Native American, 0.09% Asian, 2.13% from other races, and 1.21% from two or more races. Hispanic or Latino of any race were 6.77%.

Of the 418 households, 28.7% had children under the age of 18 living with them, 54.8% were married couples living together, 6.9% had a female householder with no husband present, and 35.2% were non-families. 31.3% of households were one person, and 20.6% were one person aged 65 or older. The average household size was 2.45 and the average family size was 3.11.

The age distribution was: 25.6% under the age of 18, 8.9% aged from 18 to 24, 22.4% from 25 to 44, 18.6% from 45 to 64, and 24.6% aged 65 years or older. The median age was 40 years. For every 100 females, there were 91.8 males. For every 100 females age 18 and over there were 92.3 males.

As of 2000 the median income for a household in the city was $31,875, and the median family income was $42,188. Males had a median income of $29,750 versus $19,844 for females. The per capita income for the city was $14,663. About 7.0% of families and 11.1% of the population were below the poverty line, including 17.6% of those under age 18 and 8.456% of those age 65 or over.

== Notable people ==
- Richie Ashburn, former baseball player and Hall of Fame member for the Philadelphia Phillies; born in Tilden on March 19, 1927
- Walter Brueggemann, theologian and author; born in Tilden on March 11, 1933
- L. Ron Hubbard, author and founder of Scientology; born in Tilden in 1911

== See also ==
- List of municipalities in Nebraska
