= Warnerville, Nebraska =

Unincorporated community in Nebraska, U.S.

Coordinates: 41°57′36″N 97°26′46″W

Warnerville is an unincorporated community in Madison County, Nebraska, United States.

== History ==
A post office was established at Warnerville in 1887, and remained in operation until it was discontinued in 1917. The community was named for H. Warner, a local businessman.
