= Madison County, Nebraska =

County in Nebraska, United States

- County
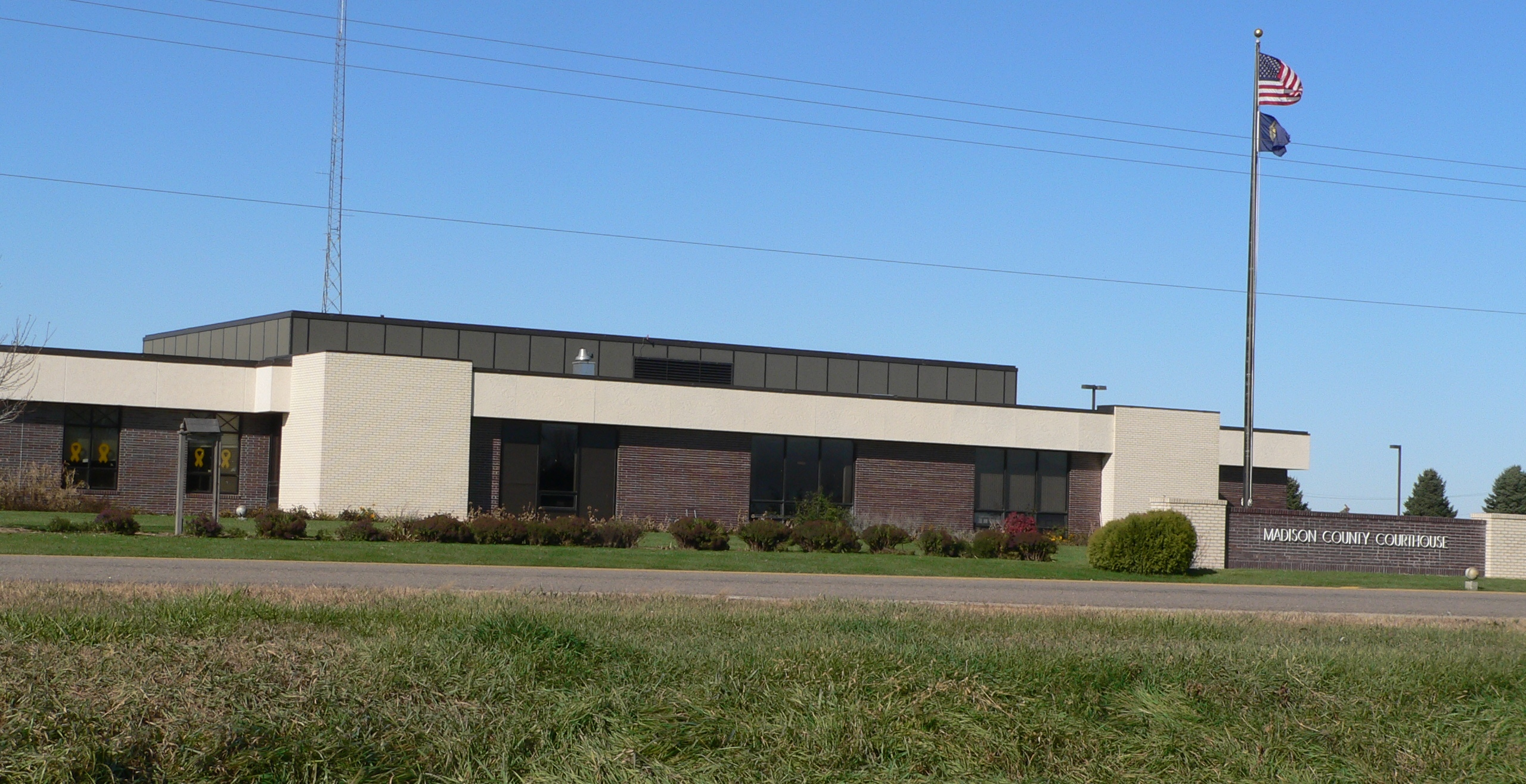
- The Madison County Courthouse in Madison

- Location within the U.S. state of Nebraska
- Coordinates: 41.9099°N 97.6069°W
- Country: United States
- State: Nebraska
- Created: January 26, 1856
- Organized: January 21, 1868
- Named for: James Madison
- Seat: Madison
- Largest city: Norfolk

Area
  - Total: 575.451 sq mi (1,490.41 km^{2})
  - Land: 572.612 sq mi (1,483.06 km^{2})
  - Water: 2.839 sq mi (7.35 km^{2}) 0.49%

Population (2020)
  - Total: 35,585
  - Estimate (2025): 36,106 ▲
  - Density: 62.145/sq mi (23.994/km^{2})
- Time zone: UTC−6 (Central)
  - Summer (DST): UTC−5 (CDT)
- Area code: 402 and 531
- Congressional district: 1st
- Website: madisoncountyne.gov
- • Nebraska county number 59 • Nebraska license plate prefix 07

Madison County is a county in the U.S. state of Nebraska. As of the 2020 census, the population was 35,585, and was estimated to be 36,106 in 2025, making it the seventh-most populous county in Nebraska. The county seat is Madison and the largest city is Norfolk.

Madison County is part of the Norfolk, NE micropolitan area.

In the Nebraska license plate system, Madison County was represented by the prefix "7" (as it had the seventh-largest number of vehicles registered in the state when the license plate system was established in 1922).

== History ==
Madison County was created on January 26, 1856 and organized on January 21, 1868.

Madison County was likely named for Madison, Wisconsin, which is where many of the county's residents came from; the city was named for James Madison, fourth President of the United States.

== Geography ==
According to the United States Census Bureau, the county has a total area of 575.451 square miles (1,490.41 km^{2}), of which 572.612 square miles (1,483.06 km^{2}) is land and 2.839 square miles (7.35 km^{2}) (0.49%) is water. It is the 53rd-largest county in Nebraska by total area.

The terrain in Madison County consists of gently rolling terrain, sloped to the east-southeast, largely devoted to agriculture. The Elkhorn River runs eastward across the upper central portion of the county.

=== Major highways ===
- U.S. Highway 81
- U.S. Highway 275
- Nebraska Highway 24
- Nebraska Highway 32
- Nebraska Highway 35
- Nebraska Highway 45
- Nebraska Highway 121

=== Transit ===
- Express Arrow

=== Adjacent counties ===
- Wayne County – northeast
- Stanton County – east
- Platte County – south
- Boone County – southwest
- Antelope County – northwest
- Pierce County – north

=== Protected areas ===
- Oak Valley State Wildlife Management Area
- Yellowbanks State Wildlife Management Area

== Demographics ==
Historical population
Census	Pop.	Note	%±
1870	1,133		—
1880	5,589		393.3%
1890	13,669		144.6%
1900	16,976		24.2%
1910	19,101		12.5%
1920	22,511		17.9%
1930	26,037		15.7%
1940	24,269		−6.8%
1950	24,338		0.3%
1960	25,145		3.3%
1970	27,402		9.0%
1980	31,382		14.5%
1990	32,655		4.1%
2000	35,226		7.9%
2010	34,876		−1.0%
2020	35,585		2.0%
2025 (est.)	36,106	▲	1.5%
U.S. Decennial Census; 1790–1960 1900–1990; 1990–2000 2010–2020

As of the third quarter of 2025, the median home value in Madison County was $218,668.

As of the 2024 American Community Survey, there are 14,462 estimated households in Madison County with an average of 2.39 persons per household. The county has a median household income of $63,128. Approximately 13.1% of the county's population lives at or below the poverty line. Madison County has an estimated 65.3% employment rate, with 23.7% of the population holding a bachelor's degree or higher and 91.1% holding a high school diploma. There were 15,510 housing units at an average density of 27.09 per square mile (10.5/km^{2}).

The top five reported languages (people were allowed to report up to two languages, thus the figures will generally add to more than 100%) were English (87.1%), Spanish (10.9%), Indo-European (0.9%), Asian and Pacific Islander (1.0%), and Other (0.1%).

The median age in the county was 37.4 years.

Madison County, Nebraska – racial and ethnic composition Note: the US Census treats Hispanic/Latino as an ethnic category. This table excludes Latinos from the racial categories and assigns them to a separate category. Hispanics/Latinos may be of any race.
Race / ethnicity (NH = non-Hispanic)	Pop. 1980	Pop. 1990	Pop. 2000	Pop. 2010	Pop. 2020
White alone (NH)	30,934 (98.57%)	31,524 (96.54%)	31,122 (88.35%)	29,062 (83.33%)	27,823 (78.19%)
Black or African American alone (NH)	28 (0.09%)	238 (0.73%)	318 (0.90%)	409 (1.17%)	404 (1.14%)
Native American or Alaska Native alone (NH)	179 (0.57%)	233 (0.71%)	370 (1.05%)	337 (0.97%)	366 (1.03%)
Asian alone (NH)	76 (0.24%)	86 (0.26%)	141 (0.40%)	157 (0.45%)	445 (1.25%)
Pacific Islander alone (NH)	—	—	8 (0.02%)	10 (0.03%)	7 (0.02%)
Other race alone (NH)	11 (0.04%)	5 (0.02%)	7 (0.02%)	17 (0.05%)	118 (0.33%)
Mixed race or multiracial (NH)	—	—	218 (0.62%)	380 (1.09%)	908 (2.55%)
Hispanic or Latino (any race)	154 (0.49%)	569 (1.74%)	3,042 (8.64%)	4,504 (12.91%)	5,514 (15.50%)
Total	31,382 (100.00%)	32,655 (100.00%)	35,226 (100.00%)	34,876 (100.00%)	35,585 (100.00%)

=== 2024 estimate ===
As of the 2024 estimate, there were 35,579 people, 14,462 households, and _ families residing in the county. The population density was 62.13 inhabitants per square mile (24.0/km^{2}). There were 15,510 housing units at an average density of 27.09 per square mile (10.5/km^{2}). The racial makeup of the county was 91.5% White (76.9% NH White), 1.9% African American, 2.5% Native American, 1.7% Asian, 0.1% Pacific Islander, _% from some other races and 2.2% from two or more races. Hispanic or Latino people of any race were 17.2% of the population.

=== 2020 census ===
As of the 2020 census, there were 35,585 people, 14,024 households, and 8,915 families residing in the county. The population density was 62.15 inhabitants per square mile (24.0/km^{2}). There were 15,094 housing units at an average density of 26.36 per square mile (10.2/km^{2}). The racial makeup of the county was 81.21% White, 1.16% African American, 1.50% Native American, 1.26% Asian, 0.03% Pacific Islander, 7.21% from some other races and 7.64% from two or more races. Hispanic or Latino people of any race were 15.50% of the population.

The median age was 37.4 years. 24.9% of residents were under the age of 18 and 17.5% of residents were 65 years of age or older. For every 100 females there were 99.1 males, and for every 100 females age 18 and over there were 99.0 males age 18 and over.

72.6% of residents lived in urban areas, while 27.4% lived in rural areas.

There were 14,024 households in the county, of which 30.7% had children under the age of 18 living with them and 25.0% had a female householder with no spouse or partner present. About 30.9% of all households were made up of individuals and 12.1% had someone living alone who was 65 years of age or older.

There were 15,094 housing units, of which 7.1% were vacant. Among occupied housing units, 66.0% were owner-occupied and 34.0% were renter-occupied. The homeowner vacancy rate was 1.2% and the rental vacancy rate was 8.9%.

=== 2010 census ===
As of the 2010 census, there were 34,876 people, 13,939 households, and 9,168 families residing in the county. The population density was 60.91 inhabitants per square mile (23.5/km^{2}). There were 13,939 housing units at an average density of 24.34 per square mile (9.4/km^{2}). The racial makeup of the county was 88.18% White, 1.27% African American, 1.15% Native American, 0.48% Asian, 0.05% Pacific Islander, 7.13% from some other races and 1.75% from two or more races. Hispanic or Latino people of any race were 12.91% of the population.

=== 2000 census ===
As of the 2000 census, there were 35,226 people, 13,436 households, and 8,894 families residing in the county. The population density was 61.52 inhabitants per square mile (23.8/km^{2}). There were 14,432 housing units at an average density of 25.20 per square mile (9.7/km^{2}). The racial makeup of the county was 91.35% White, 0.94% African American, 1.19% Native American, 0.40% Asian, 0.03% Pacific Islander, 5.06% from some other races and 1.03% from two or more races. Hispanic or Latino people of any race were 8.64% of the population.

There were 13,436 households, out of which 33.20% had children under the age of 18 living with them, 54.70% were married couples living together, 8.40% had a female householder with no husband present, and 33.80% were non-families. 27.90% of all households were made up of individuals, and 12.40% had someone living alone who was 65 years of age or older. The average household size was 2.52 and the average family size was 3.12.

The county population contained 26.80% under the age of 18, 11.60% from 18 to 24, 27.10% from 25 to 44, 20.10% from 45 to 64, and 14.40% who were 65 years of age or older. The median age was 35 years. For every 100 females, there were 98.50 males. For every 100 females age 18 and over, there were 94.80 males.

The median income for a household in the county was $35,807, and the median income for a family was $45,073. Males had a median income of $30,631 versus $21,343 for females. The per capita income for the county was $16,804. About 7.50% of families and 11.20% of the population were below the poverty line, including 13.00% of those under age 18 and 11.50% of those age 65 or over.

== Communities ==
=== Cities ===
- Battle Creek
- Madison (county seat)
- Newman Grove (partial)
- Norfolk
- Tilden (partial)

=== Village ===
- Meadow Grove

=== Unincorporated communities ===
- Emerick
- Enola
- Kalamazoo
- Warnerville

== Politics ==
Madison County voters have been strongly Republican for many decades, voting for the Republican candidate in every presidential election except for three from 1880 onward. In addition, no Democratic presidential candidate has won the county since 1936.

Political Party	Number of registered voters (April 1, 2026)	Percent
Republican	13,562	64.23%
Independent	3,829	18.13%
Democratic	3,314	15.69%
Libertarian	247	1.17%
Legal Marijuana Now	164	0.78%
Total	21,116	100.00%

United States presidential election results for Madison County, Nebraska
Year	Republican		Democratic		Third party(ies)	
Year	No.	%	No.	%	No.	%
1900	2,060	54.07%	1,690	44.36%	60	1.57%
1904	2,210	62.82%	1,049	29.82%	259	7.36%
1908	2,137	52.52%	1,878	46.15%	54	1.33%
1912	1,181	29.47%	1,718	42.87%	1,108	27.65%
1916	2,428	49.58%	2,358	48.15%	111	2.27%
1920	5,171	73.29%	1,716	24.32%	169	2.40%
1924	3,537	40.68%	1,959	22.53%	3,199	36.79%
1928	6,229	64.32%	3,407	35.18%	48	0.50%
1932	3,489	31.85%	7,366	67.24%	99	0.90%
1936	5,149	45.41%	6,044	53.30%	147	1.30%
1940	7,353	64.87%	3,982	35.13%	0	0.00%
1944	6,892	67.14%	3,373	32.86%	0	0.00%
1948	5,486	62.41%	3,304	37.59%	0	0.00%
1952	8,294	76.21%	2,589	23.79%	0	0.00%
1956	7,968	72.99%	2,949	27.01%	0	0.00%
1960	8,350	73.25%	3,050	26.75%	0	0.00%
1964	6,155	56.91%	4,661	43.09%	0	0.00%
1968	7,066	70.35%	2,364	23.54%	614	6.11%
1972	8,580	79.42%	2,224	20.58%	0	0.00%
1976	7,846	68.49%	3,433	29.97%	176	1.54%
1980	9,718	78.82%	1,926	15.62%	685	5.56%
1984	9,790	84.48%	1,757	15.16%	42	0.36%
1988	9,137	76.30%	2,779	23.21%	59	0.49%
1992	7,877	57.10%	2,364	17.14%	3,555	25.77%
1996	7,965	62.97%	3,047	24.09%	1,637	12.94%
2000	9,636	74.97%	2,772	21.57%	445	3.46%
2004	10,981	77.94%	2,934	20.82%	174	1.24%
2008	9,655	68.74%	4,142	29.49%	248	1.77%
2012	10,062	72.47%	3,485	25.10%	338	2.43%
2016	10,628	74.10%	2,711	18.90%	1,004	7.00%
2020	11,940	75.48%	3,478	21.99%	401	2.53%
2024	12,145	77.13%	3,360	21.34%	242	1.54%

== In popular culture ==
The 2013 film Nebraska is set mostly in Madison County, in the fictional town of Hawthorne. Some of the filming was done in Madison and Norfolk.

== Education ==
School districts include:

- Battle Creek Public Schools #5, Battle Creek
- Elkhorn Valley Schools #80, Tilden
- Humphrey Public Schools #67, Humphrey
- Madison Public Schools #1, Madison
- Newman Grove Public Schools #13, Newman Grove
- Norfolk Public Schools #2, Norfolk

== See also ==
- National Register of Historic Places listings in Madison County, Nebraska
- Madison County USGenWeb
