= Madison, Nebraska =

- City
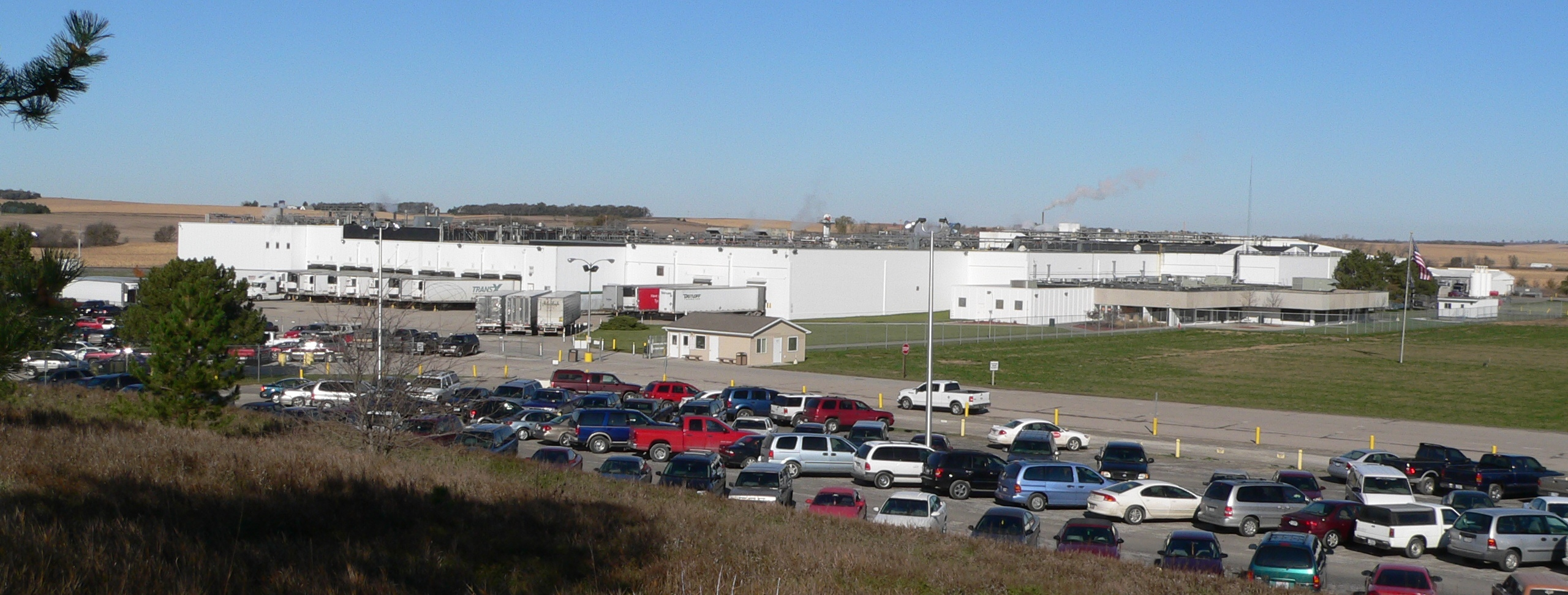
- Tyson Fresh Meats pork plant in Madison

- Location in Madison County and the state of Nebraska

- Location within Nebraska Location within the United States
- Coordinates: 41°49′42″N 97°27′24″W
- Country: United States
- State: Nebraska
- County: Madison

Area
  - Total: 1.17 sq mi (3.04 km^{2})
  - Land: 1.17 sq mi (3.04 km^{2})
  - Water: 0 sq mi (0.00 km^{2})
- Elevation: 1,581 ft (482 m)

Population (2020)
  - Total: 2,283
  - Density: 1,942.2/sq mi (749.88/km^{2})
- Time zone: UTC-6 (Central (CST))
  - Summer (DST): UTC-5 (CDT)
- ZIP code: 68748
- Area code: 402
- FIPS code: 31-30240
- GNIS feature ID: 2395810
- Website: madison-ne.com

Madison is a city in and the county seat of Madison County, Nebraska, United States. The population was 2,283 at the 2020 census.

== History ==
Madison was founded in 1867, named from Madison County. It was designated the county seat in 1875.

== Geography ==
The city is in southeastern Madison County, located just west of the junction of U.S. Route 81 and Nebraska Highway 32. US 81 leads north 15 miles (24 km) to Norfolk, the largest city in the county, and south 30 miles (48 km) to Columbus, while Highway 32 leads east 39 miles (63 km) to West Point and west 34 miles (55 km) to Petersburg.

According to the U.S. Census Bureau, Madison has a total area of 1.18 square miles (3.06 km^{2}), all land. Union Creek passes through the city just north of downtown, flowing east to join the Elkhorn River near Stanton. Taylor Creek joins Union Creek in Madison, entering the city from the north.

Madison lies at an elevation of 1,580 feet (480 m) above sea level, rising to nearly 1,700 feet (520 m) at the southern border of the city.

== Demographics ==
Historical population
Census	Pop.	Note	%±
1880	417		—
1890	930		123.0%
1900	1,479		59.0%
1910	1,708		15.5%
1920	1,735		1.6%
1930	1,842		6.2%
1940	1,812		−1.6%
1950	1,663		−8.2%
1960	1,513		−9.0%
1970	1,595		5.4%
1980	1,950		22.3%
1990	2,135		9.5%
2000	2,367		10.9%
2010	2,438		3.0%
2020	2,283		−6.4%
U.S. Decennial Census; 2012 Estimate

Madison is part of the Norfolk, Nebraska Micropolitan Statistical Area.

=== 2020 census ===
As of the 2020 census, Madison had a population of 2,283. The median age was 33.8 years. 28.7% of residents were under the age of 18 and 13.7% of residents were 65 years of age or older. For every 100 females there were 100.8 males, and for every 100 females age 18 and over there were 102.0 males age 18 and over.

0.0% of residents lived in urban areas, while 100.0% lived in rural areas.

There were 717 households in Madison, of which 42.3% had children under the age of 18 living in them. Of all households, 52.0% were married-couple households, 17.0% were households with a male householder and no spouse or partner present, and 21.8% were households with a female householder and no spouse or partner present. About 21.1% of all households were made up of individuals and 8.7% had someone living alone who was 65 years of age or older.

There were 795 housing units, of which 9.8% were vacant. The homeowner vacancy rate was 0.0% and the rental vacancy rate was 13.6%.

Racial composition as of the 2020 census
Race	Number	Percent
White	1,070	46.9%
Black or African American	15	0.7%
American Indian and Alaska Native	25	1.1%
Asian	120	5.3%
Native Hawaiian and Other Pacific Islander	1	0.0%
Some other race	575	25.2%
Two or more races	477	20.9%
Hispanic or Latino (of any race)	1,178	51.6%

=== 2010 census ===
As of the census of 2010, there were 2,438 people, 760 households, and 550 families residing in the city. The population density was 2,120.0 inhabitants per square mile (818.5/km^{2}). There were 818 housing units at an average density of 711.3 per square mile (274.6/km^{2}). The racial makeup of the city was 65.3% White, 1.0% African American, 1.0% Native American, 0.3% Asian, 30.3% from other races, and 2.1% from two or more races. Hispanic or Latino of any race were 48.8% of the population.

There were 760 households, of which 42.8% had children under the age of 18 living with them, 55.3% were married couples living together, 11.7% had a female householder with no husband present, 5.4% had a male householder with no wife present, and 27.6% were non-families. 23.0% of all households were made up of individuals, and 11.3% had someone living alone who was 65 years of age or older. The average household size was 2.99 and the average family size was 3.56.

The median age in the city was 32 years. 31.6% of residents were under the age of 18; 9.4% were between the ages of 18 and 24; 25.5% were from 25 to 44; 21.6% were from 45 to 64; and 11.7% were 65 years of age or older. The gender makeup of the city was 50.8% male and 49.2% female.

=== 2000 census ===
As of the census of 2000, there were 2,367 people, 749 households, and 533 families residing in the city. The population density was 2,072.1 inhabitants per square mile (800.0/km^{2}). There were 802 housing units at an average density of 702.1 per square mile (271.1/km^{2}). The racial makeup of the city was 75.37% White, 0.63% African American, 0.17% Native American, 0.21% Asian, 0.08% Pacific Islander, 22.48% from other races, and 1.06% from two or more races. Hispanic or Latino of any race were 33.88% of the population.

There were 749 households, out of which 39.9% had children under the age of 18 living with them, 58.7% were married couples living together, 7.5% had a female householder with no husband present, and 28.8% were non-families. 25.2% of all households were made up of individuals, and 14.6% had someone living alone who was 65 years of age or older. The average household size was 2.93 and the average family size was 3.51.

In the city, the population was spread out, with 29.8% under the age of 18, 10.4% from 18 to 24, 28.3% from 25 to 44, 16.1% from 45 to 64, and 15.4% who were 65 years of age or older. The median age was 33 years. For every 100 females, there were 108.9 males. For every 100 females age 18 and over, there were 105.9 males.

As of 2000 the median income for a household in the city was $35,758, and the median income for a family was $40,733. Males had a median income of $25,550 versus $21,386 for females. The per capita income for the city was $14,620. About 9.5% of families and 14.3% of the population were below the poverty line, including 22.1% of those under age 18 and 5.8% of those age 65 or over.

== Economy ==
The largest single employer in Madison is the Tyson Fresh Meats pork-processing plant, with 1,200 full-time employees. Other major employers are Countryside Home, a nursing home with 93 full-time and 51 part-time employees; Madison City Schools, with 97 full-time employees; and D&D Industries, a manufacturer of wood pallets with 40 full-time employees.

== Climate ==
This climatic region is typified by large seasonal temperature differences, with warm to hot (and often humid) summers and cold (sometimes severely cold) winters. According to the Köppen Climate Classification system, Madison has a humid continental climate, abbreviated "Dfa" on climate maps.

Climate data for Madison, Nebraska
Month	Jan	Feb	Mar	Apr	May	Jun	Jul	Aug	Sep	Oct	Nov	Dec	Year
Mean daily maximum °C (°F)	0 (32)	2 (36)	8 (47)	17 (62)	22 (72)	28 (82)	31 (88)	29 (85)	25 (77)	19 (66)	9 (48)	2 (35)	16 (61)
Mean daily minimum °C (°F)	−12 (10)	−10 (14)	−4 (24)	2 (36)	8 (47)	14 (58)	17 (63)	16 (61)	11 (51)	4 (39)	−4 (25)	−10 (14)	3 (37)
Average precipitation mm (inches)	15 (0.6)	20 (0.8)	38 (1.5)	66 (2.6)	100 (4)	120 (4.6)	84 (3.3)	81 (3.2)	66 (2.6)	46 (1.8)	28 (1.1)	20 (0.8)	680 (26.9)
Source: Weatherbase

== Transportation ==
Intercity bus service to the city is provided by Express Arrow.

== Notable people ==
- Frances Louise Long (1885–1946), plant ecologist who worked in the fields of plant physiology and pollination
- Horace L. McBride, lieutenant general in the U.S. Army and commander of the 80th Infantry Division in Europe during World War II
- Armitage Trail (1902–1930), author of Scarface, born in Madison but his family moved away soon after

== See also ==
- Impact of the COVID-19 pandemic on the meat industry in the United States
