= Norfolk, Nebraska =

City in Nebraska

- City
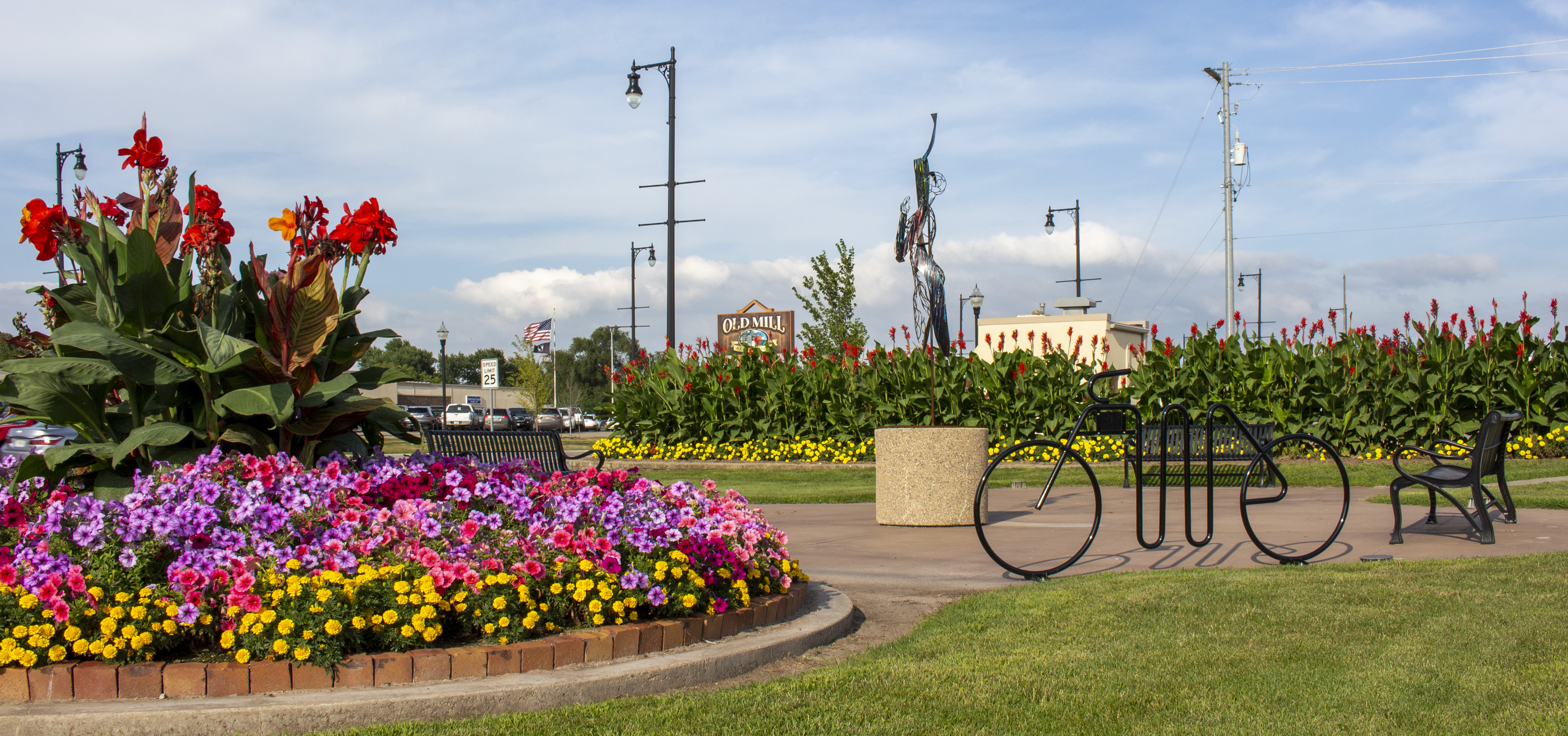
- Downtown Norfolk

- Logo

- Location in Madison County and the state of Nebraska

- Location within Nebraska Location within the United States
- Coordinates: 42°01′41″N 97°25′45″W
- Country: United States
- State: Nebraska
- County: Madison
- Founded: 1866

Area
  - Total: 18.37 sq mi (47.58 km^{2})
  - Land: 17.98 sq mi (46.56 km^{2})
  - Water: 0.39 sq mi (1.02 km^{2})
- Elevation: 1,532 ft (467 m)

Population (2020)
  - Total: 24,955
  - Density: 1,388.2/sq mi (535.97/km^{2})
- Time zone: UTC-6 (CST)
  - Summer (DST): UTC-5 (CDT)
- ZIP codes: 68701-68702
- Area code: 402
- FIPS code: 31-34615
- GNIS feature ID: 2395248
- Website: norfolkne.gov

Norfolk is a city in Madison County, Nebraska, United States, 113 miles (182 km) northwest of Omaha and 76 miles southwest of Sioux City, Iowa, at the intersection of U.S. Routes 81 and 275. The population was 24,955 at the 2020 census, making it the seventh-most populous city in Nebraska. It is the principal city of the Norfolk Micropolitan Statistical Area.

== History ==
=== Settlement and early history ===
In late 1865 three scouts were sent from a German Lutheran settlement near Ixonia, Wisconsin, to find productive, inexpensive farmland that could be claimed under the Homestead Act. From the Omaha area they followed the Elkhorn River upstream to West Point. Finding that area too crowded, they continued up the river. On September 15, they reached the junction of the Elkhorn and its North Fork, and chose that area as a settlement site. On May 23, 1866, a party of 124 settlers representing 42 families from the Ixonia area set out for northeast Nebraska in three wagon trains. They arrived at the new site on July 15. A second group of settlers from Wisconsin arrived in July 1867. These collective wagon parties established the first church in Madison County, St. Paul's Lutheran.

The original name of the colony was a variant of "North Fork", but accounts differ on the exact name: "Northfork", "Nor'fork", and "Nordfork" are all suggested. The name was submitted to federal postal authorities, and at some point was transmuted to "Norfolk". Nebraskans typically pronounce it as "Norfork".

The North Fork settlement was named the county seat in 1867. In 1875 a series of elections changed this. In the first of these Norfolk, which at the time had 45 voters, was eliminated. In a subsequent election Madison was chosen over Battle Creek.

=== Railroads and growth ===
The Fremont, Elkhorn and Missouri Valley Railroad was built after the discovery of gold in the Black Hills in South Dakota. It ran from the Omaha area up the Elkhorn valley, then across northern Nebraska and into South Dakota. Its arrival at Norfolk in 1879 connected the city through Wisner to Blair on the Missouri. The Omaha, Niobrara, and Black Hills branch of the Union Pacific ran north from the railroad's main line at Columbus to Norfolk; it reached the city in 1880. The Chicago, St. Paul, Minneapolis & Omaha Railroad was completed to Norfolk in 1882.

The development of these railway connections led to significant growth in the city. In 1886 Norfolk's population reached 1,000, making it a city of the second class. A street railway system and a public water supply were established in 1887. In 1888 a franchise was granted to the Norfolk Electric Light Company, and the Nebraska Telephone Company was given a right-of-way for "general telegraph and telephone business".

The Nebraska legislature created the Insane Asylum in Norfolk in 1885; it accepted its first patients in 1888. In 1920, the institution's name was changed to the Norfolk State Hospital; in 1962, it became the Norfolk Regional Center. As of 2010, it was a 120-bed institution providing the initial phase of treatment to sex offenders.

=== Automobile age ===
In 1900, the city had a population of 3,883, nearly quadruple its population of a decade earlier. By 1910, it had more than 6,000 people, comprising roughly one-third of Madison County's population of 19,101. In 1915, petitions were filed for an election to move the county seat from Madison to Norfolk. The measure, however, failed to secure the necessary number of votes.

In the 1910s, development began on the Meridian Highway as a direct north–south route across the United States; the route of the highway ran through Norfolk. The 1924 completion of the Meridian Bridge across the Missouri River at the Nebraska-South Dakota border made the highway a continuous year-round thoroughfare. In 1926, it was designated as U.S. Highway 81. A second federal highway, U.S. Highway 275, received its designation in 1939; it follows the Elkhorn valley upstream from Omaha through Norfolk to O'Neill. During World War II, the segment from Norfolk to O'Neill was a portion of the Strategic Network of Highways; as such, it was given a high priority for federal funds for materials and for federal maintenance funds.

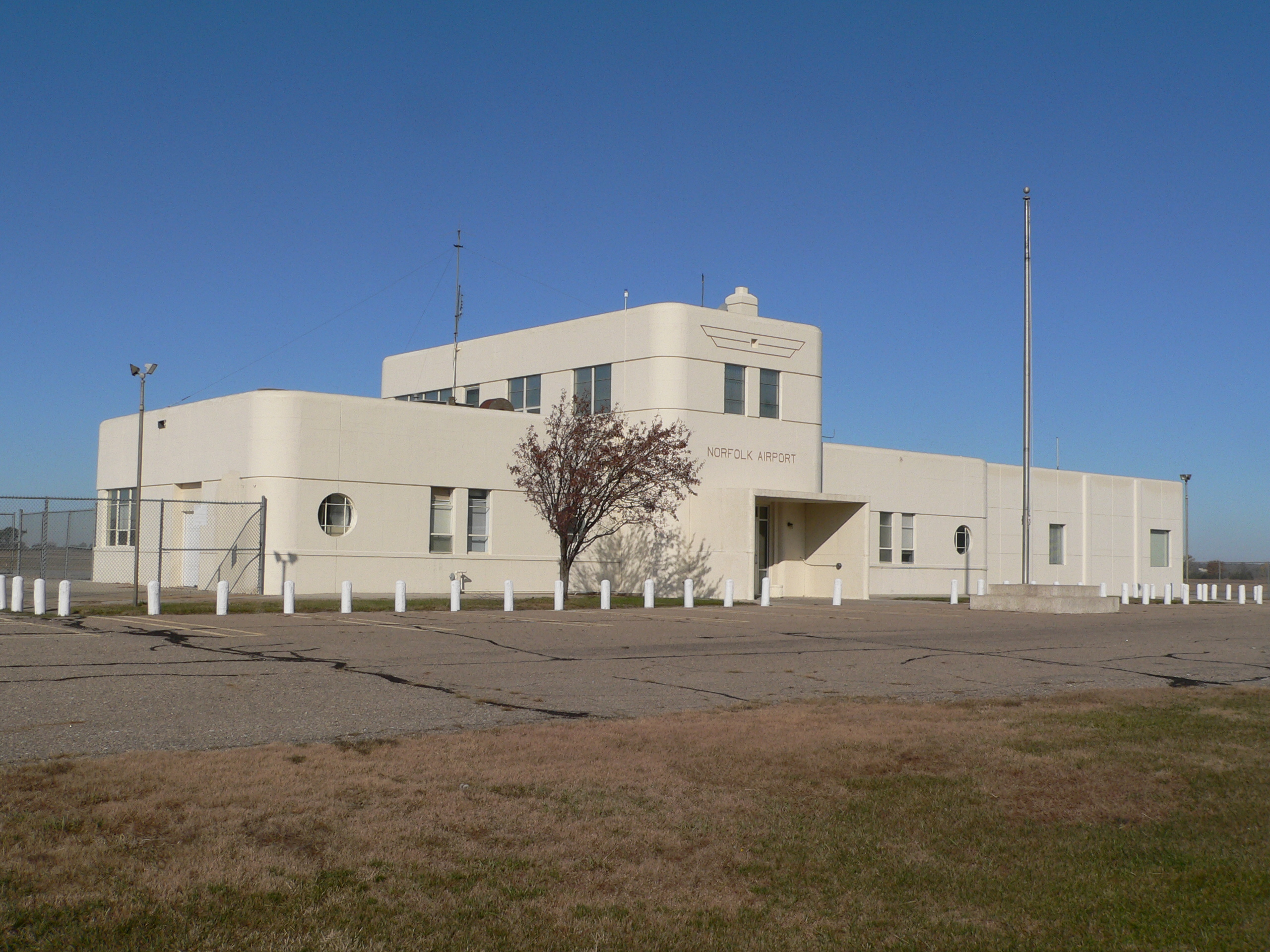
Former terminal building, Karl Stefan Airport

Air travel developed in Norfolk beginning with the establishment of a flying school in 1928. The school's field gradually expanded and was improved. In 1942 the WPA began construction of a municipal airport at the site. Although construction materials were limited during World War II, Norfolk received priority as an auxiliary field to several war-related airports, including Sioux City Air Field. After the war, Congressman Karl Stefan, a resident of Norfolk and a member of the Congressional Air Policy Board, used his influence to secure further funding for the airport. Commercial passenger flight through the airport began in the early 1950s.

In the 1970s, another attempt was made to move the county seat from Madison to Norfolk. In a 1975 county-wide election, the move's proponents failed to secure a simple majority. A 60% majority would have been necessary for the measure to pass.

=== Norfolk bank murders ===
On September 26, 2002, three gunmen robbed a US Bank branch in Norfolk, killing five people in the process. This was the nation's deadliest bank robbery in at least a decade. The three gunmen were arrested the same day as was their accomplice. All four men were later convicted and sentenced for their roles in the crime. The three gunmen were given the death penalty, whereas the accomplice received life imprisonment. Additionally, one of the suspects pleaded guilty to two additional murders that occurred before the bank robbery and was given a life sentence for each victim.

== Geography ==
Norfolk is in northeastern Nebraska, in the northeast corner of Madison County. U.S. Route 81 passes through the city west of downtown, following 13th Street; it leads south 45 miles (72 km) to Columbus, Nebraska, and north 58 miles (93 km) to Yankton, South Dakota. U.S. Route 275 passes through the southern part of Norfolk on Omaha Avenue and leads southeast 42 miles (68 km) to West Point and northwest 75 miles (121 km) to O'Neill. Nebraska Highway 35 leads northeast from Norfolk 31 miles (50 km) to Wayne.

According to the U.S. Census Bureau, Norfolk has a total area of 18.5 square miles (47.91 km^{2}), of which 18.1 square miles (46.9 km^{2}) are land and 0.4 square miles (1.0 km^{2}), or 2.12%, water. The Elkhorn River passes through the southern part of the city, flowing southeast to join the Platte River west of Omaha.

=== Climate ===
Climate data for Norfolk, Nebraska (Karl Stefan Memorial Airport), 1991–2020 normals, (Note: Mean monthly maxima and minima (i.e. the expected highest and lowest temperature readings at any point during the year or given month) calculated based on data at said location from 1991 to 2020.) extremes 1893–present
Month	Jan	Feb	Mar	Apr	May	Jun	Jul	Aug	Sep	Oct	Nov	Dec	Year
Record high °F (°C)	74 (23)	76 (24)	96 (36)	102 (39)	106 (41)	109 (43)	116 (47)	110 (43)	106 (41)	98 (37)	83 (28)	72 (22)	116 (47)
Mean maximum °F (°C)	57 (14)	62 (17)	76 (24)	85 (29)	91 (33)	95 (35)	97 (36)	96 (36)	92 (33)	86 (30)	73 (23)	58 (14)	99 (37)
Mean daily maximum °F (°C)	32.7 (0.4)	37.0 (2.8)	49.6 (9.8)	61.4 (16.3)	72.2 (22.3)	82.2 (27.9)	86.4 (30.2)	84.0 (28.9)	77.4 (25.2)	63.6 (17.6)	48.3 (9.1)	35.7 (2.1)	60.9 (16.1)
Daily mean °F (°C)	22.3 (−5.4)	26.3 (−3.2)	37.8 (3.2)	48.9 (9.4)	60.1 (15.6)	70.4 (21.3)	74.8 (23.8)	72.4 (22.4)	64.4 (18.0)	50.8 (10.4)	36.8 (2.7)	25.7 (−3.5)	49.2 (9.6)
Mean daily minimum °F (°C)	11.8 (−11.2)	15.6 (−9.1)	26.0 (−3.3)	36.5 (2.5)	48.0 (8.9)	58.6 (14.8)	63.2 (17.3)	60.8 (16.0)	51.3 (10.7)	38.1 (3.4)	25.2 (−3.8)	15.6 (−9.1)	37.6 (3.1)
Mean minimum °F (°C)	−11 (−24)	−5 (−21)	5 (−15)	21 (−6)	34 (1)	46 (8)	51 (11)	49 (9)	35 (2)	21 (−6)	7 (−14)	−6 (−21)	−4 (−20)
Record low °F (°C)	−39 (−39)	−35 (−37)	−20 (−29)	−5 (−21)	21 (−6)	34 (1)	42 (6)	36 (2)	20 (−7)	2 (−17)	−15 (−26)	−30 (−34)	−39 (−39)
Average precipitation inches (mm)	0.61 (15)	0.80 (20)	1.44 (37)	2.73 (69)	4.00 (102)	4.37 (111)	2.98 (76)	3.50 (89)	2.37 (60)	2.15 (55)	1.22 (31)	0.84 (21)	27.01 (686)
Average snowfall inches (cm)	6.9 (18)	6.1 (15)	4.5 (11)	2.3 (5.8)	0.0 (0.0)	0.0 (0.0)	0.0 (0.0)	0.0 (0.0)	0.0 (0.0)	0.8 (2.0)	3.2 (8.1)	6.1 (15)	29.9 (76)
Average precipitation days (≥ 0.01 in)	6.1	6.2	7.6	9.6	11.8	10.8	9.2	9.3	7.8	7.4	5.7	6.0	97.5
Average snowy days (≥ 0.1 in)	5.1	4.9	3.1	1.5	0.0	0.0	0.0	0.0	0.0	0.6	2.3	4.4	21.9
Average relative humidity (%)	67.8	70.3	68.4	60.6	63.1	62.2	65.6	69.1	65.6	63.8	69.3	72.3	66.5
Source: NOAA (humidity 1961–1990)

== Demographics ==
Historical population
Census	Pop.	Note	%±
1880	547		—
1890	3,038		455.4%
1900	3,883		27.8%
1910	6,025		55.2%
1920	8,634		43.3%
1930	10,717		24.1%
1940	10,490		−2.1%
1950	11,335		8.1%
1960	13,111		15.7%
1970	16,607		26.7%
1980	19,449		17.1%
1990	21,476		10.4%
2000	23,516		9.5%
2010	24,210		3.0%
2020	24,955		3.1%
U.S. Decennial Census

=== 2020 census ===
As of the 2020 census, Norfolk had a population of 24,955, 10,176 households, and 5,724 families. The population density was 1,387.9 per square mile (536.0/km^{2}).

The median age was 36.2 years. 24.2% of residents were under the age of 18 and 17.1% of residents were 65 years of age or older. For every 100 females there were 96.5 males, and for every 100 females age 18 and over there were 96.8 males age 18 and over.

99.9% of residents lived in urban areas, while 0.1% lived in rural areas.

There were 10,176 households in Norfolk, of which 30.0% had children under the age of 18 living in them. Of all households, 44.0% were married-couple households, 21.2% were households with a male householder and no spouse or partner present, and 28.1% were households with a female householder and no spouse or partner present. About 34.2% of all households were made up of individuals and 12.5% had someone living alone who was 65 years of age or older.

There were 10,909 housing units, of which 6.7% were vacant. The homeowner vacancy rate was 1.2% and the rental vacancy rate was 8.8%.

Racial composition as of the 2020 census
Race	Number	Percent
White	20,048	80.3%
Black or African American	380	1.5%
American Indian and Alaska Native	453	1.8%
Asian	282	1.1%
Native Hawaiian and Other Pacific Islander	4	0.0%
Mixed Race	1,816	7.3%
Two or more races	1,972	7.9%
Hispanic or Latino (of any race)	3,941	15.8%

=== 2016–2020 American Community Survey ===
The 2016–2020 5-year American Community Survey estimates show that the median household income was $49,280 (with a margin of error of ± $3,354) and the median family income $68,608 (± $5,266). Males had a median income of $39,418 (± $2,586) versus $27,006 (± $972) for females. The median income for those above 16 years old was $32,637 (± $1,628). Approximately, 9.9% of families and 16.0% of the population were below the poverty line, including 18.9% of those under the age of 18 and 13.4% of those ages 65 or over.

=== 2010 census ===
As of the census of 2010, there were 24,210 people, 9,910 households, and 6,005 families living in the city. The population density was 2,264.7 inhabitants per square mile (874.4/km^{2}). There were 10,625 housing units at an average density of 993.9 per square mile (383.7/km^{2}). The racial makeup of the city was 88.0% White, 1.6% African American, 1.4% Native American, 0.6% Asian, 6.3% from other races, and 2.0% from two or more races. Hispanic or Latino of any race were 12.1% of the population.

There were 9,910 households, of which 31.0% had children under the age of 18 living with them, 46.3% were married couples living together, 10.6% had a female householder with no husband present, 3.7% had a male householder with no wife present, and 39.4% were non-families. 32.5% of all households were made up of individuals, and 11.3% had someone living alone who was 65 years of age or older. The average household size was 2.36 and the average family size was 3.00.

The median age in the city was 35.5 years. 24.5% of residents were under the age of 18; 12.1% were between the ages of 18 and 24; 23.6% were from 25 to 44; 25.1% were from 45 to 64; and 14.6% were 65 years of age or older. The gender makeup of the city was 49.0% male and 51.0% female.

=== 2000 census ===
As of the census of 2000, there were 23,516 people, 9,360 households, and 5,868 families living in the city. The population density was 2,358.0 inhabitants per square mile (910.4/km^{2}). There were 10,072 housing units at an average density of 1,009.9 per square mile (389.9/km^{2}). The racial makeup of the city was 91.41% White, 1.16% African American, 1.53% Native American, 0.48% Asian, 0.03% Pacific Islander, 4.19% from other races, and 1.19% from two or more races. Hispanic or Latino of any race were 7.61% of the population.

There were 9,360 households, out of which 31.7% had children under the age of 18 living with them, 50.0% were married couples living together, 9.7% had a female householder with no husband present, and 37.3% were non-families. 30.1% of all households were made up of individuals, and 12.8% had someone living alone who was 65 years of age or older. The average household size was 2.43 and the average family size was 3.06.

In the city, the population was spread out, with 25.9% under the age of 18, 13.4% from 18 to 24, 27.4% from 25 to 44, 19.0% from 45 to 64, and 14.2% who were 65 years of age or older. The median age was 34 years. For every 100 females, there were 94.5 males. For every 100 females age 18 and over, there were 90.2 males.

As of 2000 the median income for a household in the city was $34,609, and the median income for a family was $45,460. Males had a median income of $31,445 versus $21,397 for females. The per capita income for the city was $16,990. About 7.0% of families and 11.0% of the population were below the poverty line, including 11.6% of those under age 18 and 12.2% of those age 65 or over.

== Economy ==
Norfolk is the principal retail center of northeastern Nebraska. Other significant elements of the local economy include agriculture, manufacturing, and services including education and health care.

Major local manufacturers include:

- Nucor, which employs about 1,200 people manufacturing steel products at four locations in Norfolk
- Covidien, with about 440 employees producing syringes and other medical supplies
- Continental, employing about 350 producing high-pressure and hydraulic hose
- Norfolk Iron and Metal, with 320 employees manufacturing steel products
- Wis-Pak, employing about 100 to produce soft drinks and other beverages

Major non-manufacturing commercial employers include Wal-Mart, with about 410 employees, and Associated Wholesale Grocers, formerly known as Affiliated Foods Midwest, whose distribution center in Norfolk employs about 650. Other major employers include Faith Regional Health Services, a nonprofit with about 1,300 employees, and Norfolk Public Schools, with about 700.

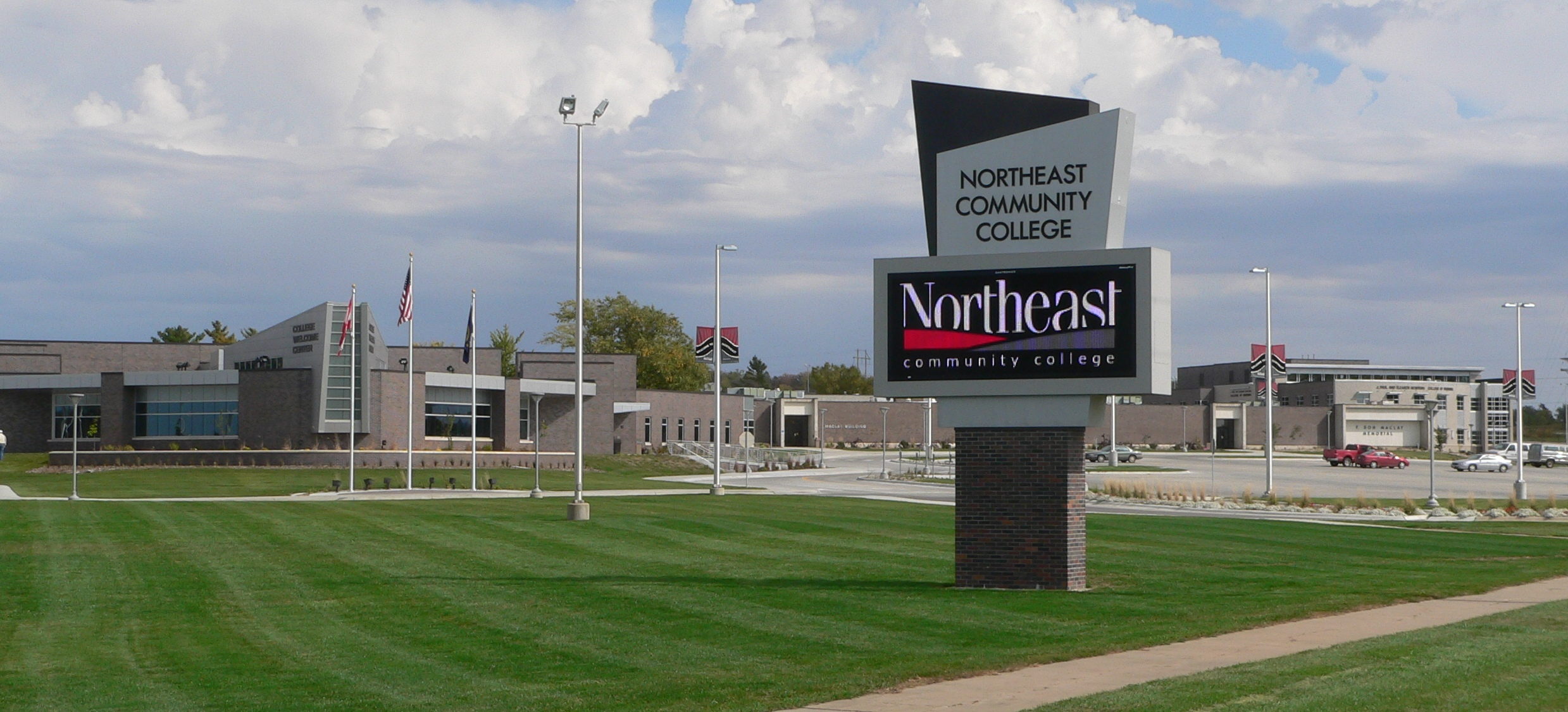
Northeast Community College

== Education ==
Norfolk has a single post-secondary educational institution, Northeast Community College, with over 7,000 students taking courses for credit. Over 18,000 students took non-credit courses; another 1,200 were in adult-education courses, including GED preparation, English as a second language, and preparation for the Naturalization test.

The Norfolk Public School District has an enrollment of over 4,000 students. There are seven elementary schools, six in Norfolk and one in the Woodland Park community; one preschool; one junior high school; and two high schools, Norfolk Senior High School and Alternatives For Success, the latter described as an "alternative high school". These schools lie between the Norfolk and Woodland Park communities.

There are several private elementary and high schools in the city. Norfolk Catholic Schools operates a grade school and Norfolk Catholic High School, with a total enrollment of about 650. Two Lutheran elementary schools and a high school enroll a total of about 470 pupils. St. Paul's Lutheran School is a Pre-K-8 school of the Wisconsin Evangelical Lutheran Synod (WELS) in Norfolk. Keystone Christian Academy enrolled about 60 students in pre-school through twelfth grade until its closure in May 2019.

== Media ==
The Norfolk Daily News is the city's principal newspaper. It is published six days a week (excluding Sundays).

Norfolk has two television stations, KXNE-TV 19 (DTV 16), which is part of the NET Television network, and KNEN-LD 35 (DTV 35), operating as part of the statewide network News Channel Nebraska (NCN). Three Sioux City stations -- KTIV (NBC), KMEG (Dabl) and KPTH (Fox/CBS) -- also operate low-power translators just east of the city.

Norfolk has one AM station: WJAG 780 (news/talk). There are seven FM stations: KXNE-FM 89.3 (public radio); KPNO 90.9 (Christian talk); K219DW 91.9 (Christian talk); KUSO 92.7 (country); KNEN 94.7 (rock); KEXL 97.5 (adult contemporary), and KQKX 106.7 (country).

== Infrastructure ==
=== Transportation ===
Intercity bus service to the city is provided by Express Arrow.

The commercial airport is Norfolk Regional Airport.

== Notable people ==
- Joyce Ballantyne, painter of pin-up art; born in Norfolk
- Jim Buchanan, a major-league baseball pitcher for the St. Louis Browns
- Max Carl (Gronenthal), singer and songwriter for .38 Special; grew up in Humphrey and graduated from a Norfolk High School
- Orville Carlisle, inventor of model rocketry in 1954, working in the basement of his shoe store
- Television host Johnny Carson (born in Corning, Iowa) moved to Norfolk at the age of 8 and graduated from Norfolk High School.
- Jeromey Clary, offensive tackle for the San Diego Chargers; born in Norfolk
- Mike Flood, U.S. representative for Nebraska's 1st congressional district
- Judi M. gaiashkibos, executive director of the Nebraska Commission on Indian Affairs
- Joyce Hall, who created the Norfolk Post Card Company in 1908. The company eventually moved to Kansas City, Missouri, where it became Hallmark Cards.
- Philip N. Krasne, producer of the later Charlie Chan films and the Cisco Kid television series
- Bill Lafleur, punter for San Francisco 49ers for two years; graduated from Norfolk Catholic High School in 1994
- Patrick M. Martin, later a congressman from California
- Scott Munter, pitcher for the San Francisco Giants; born in Norfolk
- Shane Osborn, pilot of the plane downed in the Hainan Island incident, and later Nebraska State Treasurer; raised in Norfolk and graduated from Norfolk High School
- Doris Pawn, actress in silent motion pictures
- Thurl Ravenscroft, best known as the voice of "Tony the Tiger" and as the singer of the song "You're a Mean One, Mr. Grinch"; born in Norfolk
- The Smoke Ring, 1960s rock band
- Don Stewart, actor best known for his role in Guiding Light
- Dean White, billionaire entrepreneur
