= Saint Leonard Catholic Church (Madison, Nebraska) =

Historic church in Nebraska, United States

- St. Leonard Catholic Church
- U.S. National Register of Historic Places
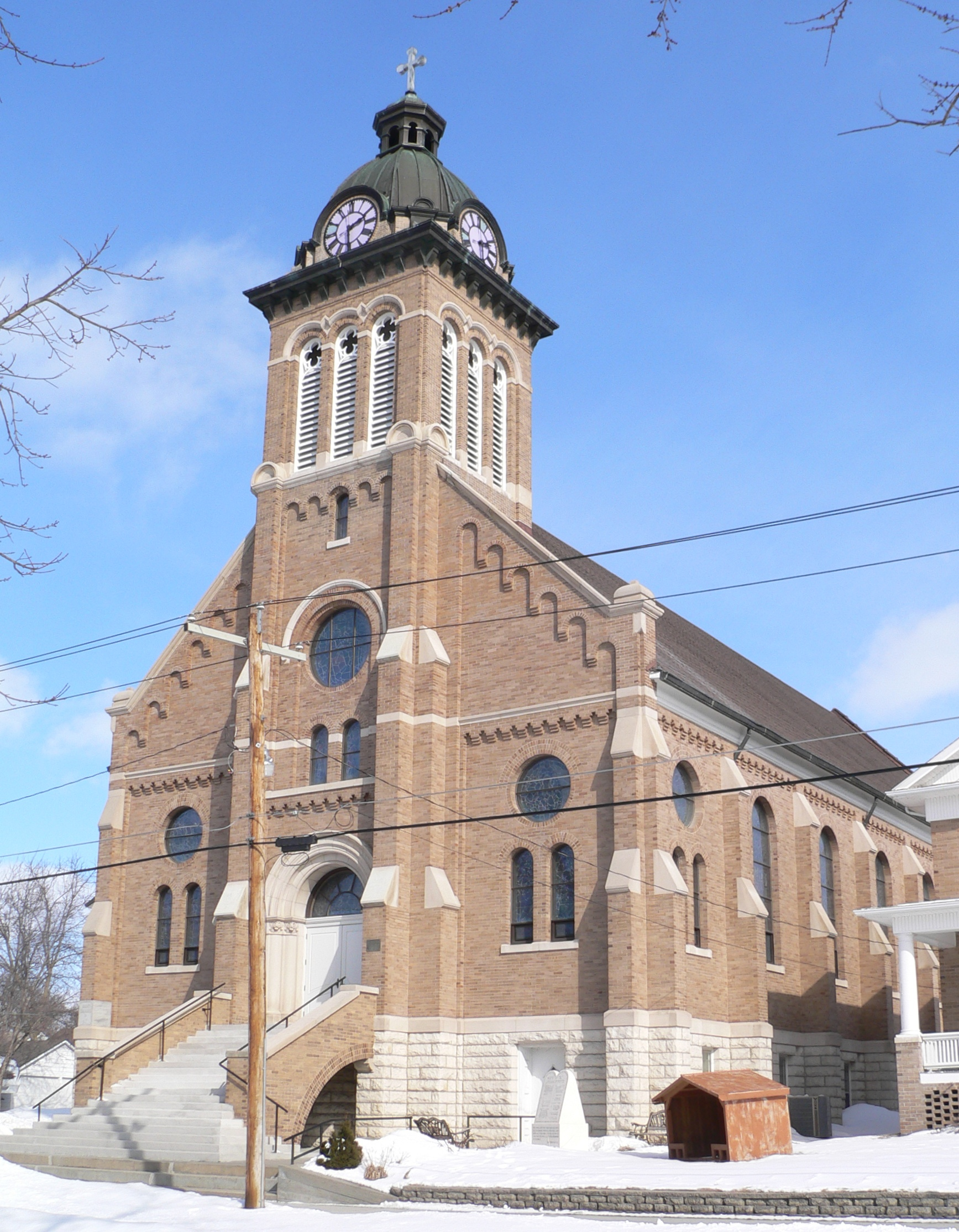
- Church, viewed from the southwest

- Location within Nebraska Location within the United States
- Location: 504 S. Nebraska St., Madison, Nebraska
- Coordinates: 41.825932°N 97.453197°W
- Built: 1913
- Architect: Jacob M. Nachtigall
- Architectural style: Church, Romanesque Revival; rectory, Neoclassical
- NRHP reference No.: 89002038
- Added to NRHP: November 27, 1989

Saint Leonard Catholic Church is a Roman Catholic church in the city of Madison, in the state of Nebraska in the Midwestern United States. Built in 1913, it has been described as "an outstanding example of the Romanesque Revival style of architecture."

St. Leonard's parish, named after Saint Leonard of Port Maurice, was organized in 1879. A wood-frame church was built in 1881 on the outskirts of Madison, and moved into the city in 1898. In 1902, the basement of the current church was built, and the congregation moved into it, converting the old church to a school. When funds allowed, the basement was extended, and the current brick church completed in 1913.

In 1989, the church, its 1912 rectory, and the rectory's garage were listed in the National Register of Historic Places, as the work of noted Nebraska architect Jacob M. Nachtigall. A pupil of Thomas Rogers Kimball, Nachtigall designed a number of Catholic churches and other buildings in the state, several of which are also listed in the National Register.

== History ==
The first white settlers to occupy the site of Madison were a party led by Henry Mitchell Barnes, who settled near the junction of Union and Taylor Creeks in 1867. Growth of the new settlement was rapid; in particular, there was an influx of German families from Wisconsin. The town of Madison was officially platted by Barnes in 1870 or 1871. In 1875, it became the county seat of Madison County, and in 1876 it was incorporated. The Union Pacific Railroad reached Madison in 1879; by 1880, the town had a population of about 300.

The first Christian services held in Madison were Presbyterian, taking place in Barnes's and other homes. A Presbyterian congregation was organized in 1870, and a church built in 1872. A Methodist circuit encompassing Madison and Antelope counties was organized in 1871; a parsonage was built in Madison ca. 1875, and a church begun in 1877. A Lutheran congregation may have formed in Madison in about 1875, although early records are incomplete; the congregation was initially served by the pastor of a Lutheran church in Green Garden Precinct, located about seven miles (11 km) southwest of Madison. It was formally organized in 1885, and a church built in Madison in 1887.

The first Catholic settlers in Madison County homesteaded near present-day Battle Creek, northwest of Madison, in the late 1860s. In 1874, they organized a parish; in 1874–75, they built St. Patrick's Church, the county's first Catholic church. In 1877, they wrote to Bishop James O'Connor of the Diocese of Omaha, asking that a priest be assigned to visit the church at intervals until a permanent priest could be assigned to the parish; in apparent response to this, Franciscan missionaries based in Columbus were given the responsibility of providing for Madison County.

=== 1879–1900 ===
In 1879, a group of Catholic residents of the Madison area met to plan the building of a church. At the meeting, a total of $426.75 was subscribed; additional contributions of $322.86 were obtained from citizens of Madison. In January 1880, the church's trustees spent $100 for five acres (2.0 ha) on a hill at the southeastern edge of town. In the spring, a party of parishioners drove their ox teams to Wisner, about 30 miles (50 km) northeast of Madison, for the first load of lumber for the new church. The 30-by-40-foot (9 m × 12 m) frame structure, with a capacity of 100, was completed in November 1881; the total cost was $957.61, leaving $208.00 owed to the carpenter. The new church was dedicated to St. Leonard of Port Maurice, an 18th-century Franciscan priest, preacher, ascetic, and writer venerated as the patron saint of parish missions.

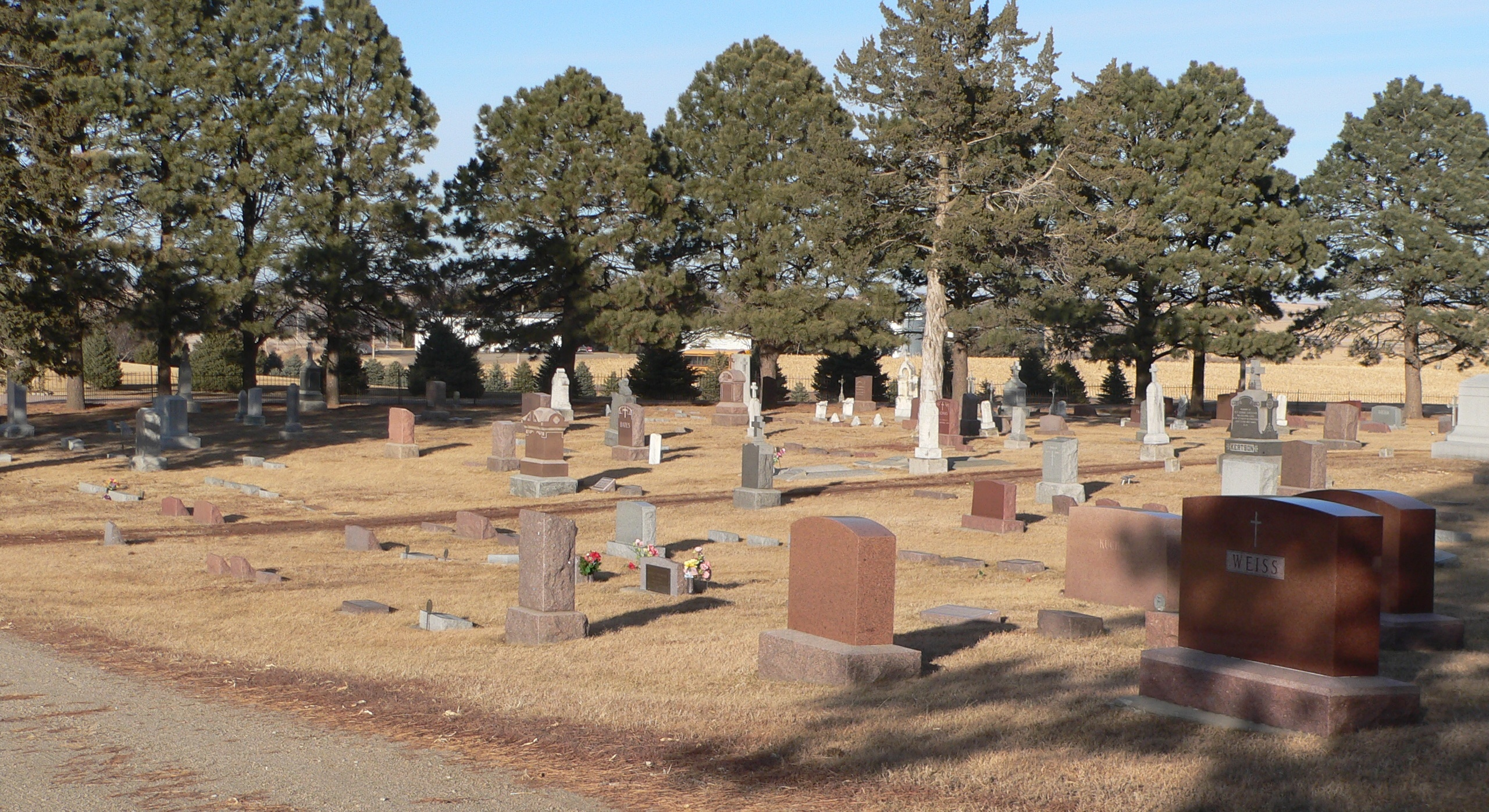
St. Leonard's cemetery

In 1882, a parcel of land southeast of the church was purchased for a cemetery; a one-year-old child buried in September of that year became its first occupant. The cemetery was fenced in 1883. In 1884, the church was enlarged: a sacristy and a room for the priest were added to the east end, and a steeple to the west end.

As Madison's population grew, the church became too small for the expanding congregation. In addition, its location outside of the city was inconvenient for many parishioners. In 1898, a tract of land inside Madison was bought. Rather than building a new church at the time, the parish elected to move the old one to the new site. The church was moved in two parts; when it was reconstructed, another section was added between them, increasing the building's seating capacity to 180. The church on the new site was dedicated in November 1898.

=== 1900–1913 ===
In the early 20th century, the parish decided that the old church should be remodelled into a school and a convent for the teachers, and that a new church should be built. Brother Leonard Darscheid, a Franciscan architect, drew up plans for a church; but financial constraints precluded its construction. Instead, a temporary basement church was built just west of the old church building. It is not known whether the design of the basement used Darscheid's plans. Construction of the basement church began in July 1902, services were held there beginning in September 1902, and it was dedicated in February 1903.

The school opened in September 1903, with two classrooms staffed by two members of the Sisters of the Presentation of Dubuque, Iowa. 66 students were enrolled, including a number of non-Catholics, owing to overcrowding in the public schools. To make more space available, a basement was dug in 1904. In 1910, a third classroom was added.

In 1910, the Franciscans turned the management of the parish over to the Diocese of Omaha. In October of that year, Edward S. Muenich became the first diocesan pastor of St. Leonard's.

Muenich embarked upon an extensive building campaign, for which he retained Omaha architect Jacob M. Nachtigall. Born in Germany in 1874, Nachtigall had immigrated to the United States with his family in 1883. Initially working as a laborer in Omaha, he had served as a draftsman for that city's 1898 Trans-Mississippi and International Exposition. He had then worked as a draftsman for Omaha architect Thomas Rogers Kimball from 1900 to 1908; during this time, Kimball had designed the city's St. Cecilia's Cathedral. In 1909, Nachtigall had opened his own architectural office.

In 1911, a two-story eight-room brick rectory designed by Nachtigall was begun; it was completed and furnished in 1912, at a cost of $10,374. In the fall of 1912, the church basement was extended by over 50 percent.

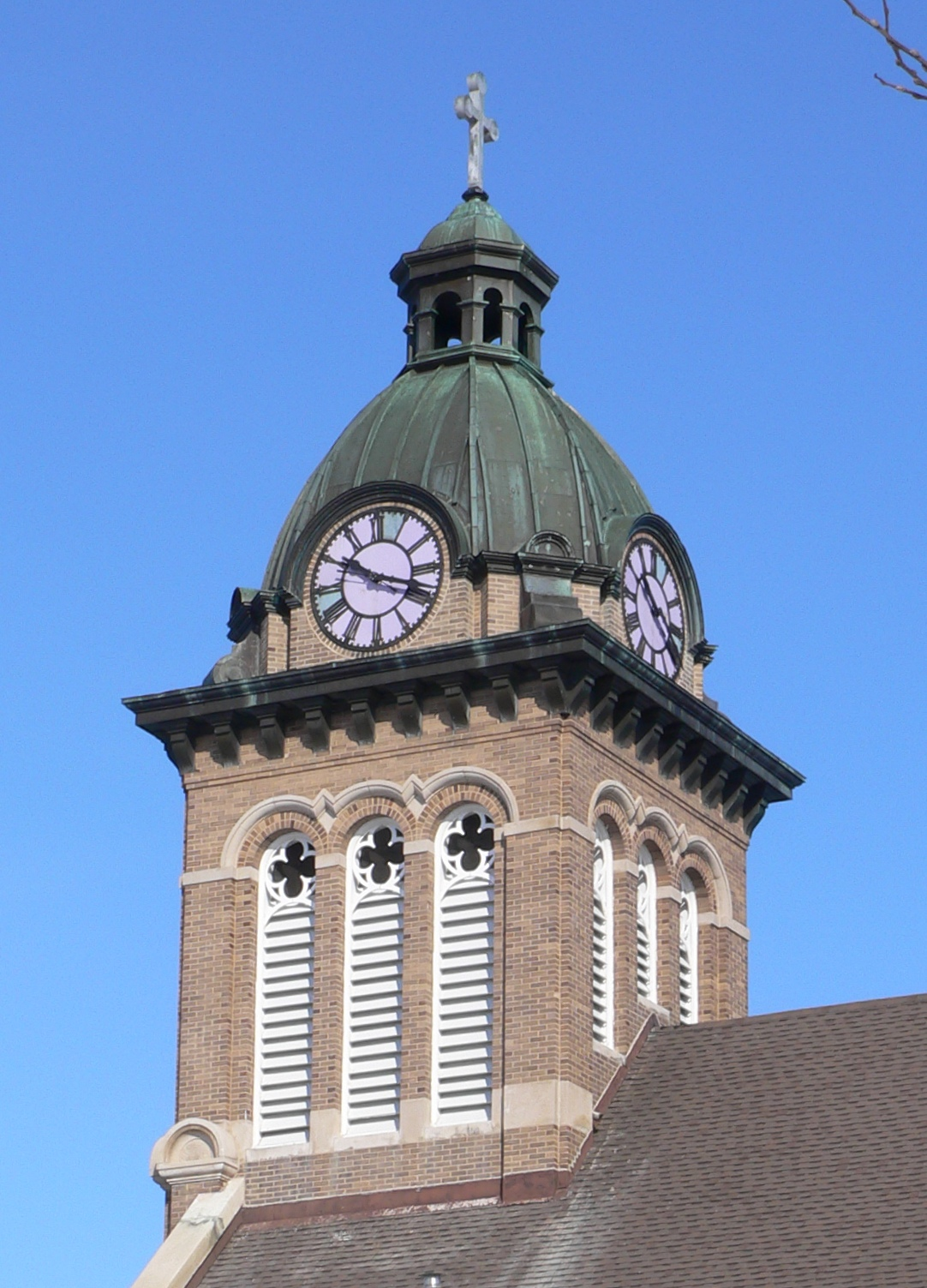
Church tower, seen from southeast

=== 1913–1946 ===
In 1913, a Romanesque Revival church designed by Nachtigall was built on the existing basement. The cornerstone was laid and construction begun in May; the church was completed by the end of November, and formally dedicated on December 4. The cost of construction was about $75,000. While the church was under construction, Catholic services were held in Madison's armory.

The new church had a seating capacity of 700. In its 110-foot (34 m) tower was a clock with four six-foot (1.8 m) dials, and a peal of three bells, contributed by the citizens of Madison; beside summoning the parishioners to Mass, these rang the quarter-hours, marking time for the residents of the city and the surrounding rural areas.

While the urban United States experienced an economic boom during the 1920s, the agricultural sector of the country experienced a depression. Disruption of European agriculture by World War I had produced high prices for farm commodities, and it had been thought that Europe's recovery would be slow and that the high prices would persist. This gave rise to a bubble in farmland prices, which burst when the rapid postwar recovery of European agriculture drove commodity prices down again. At the same time, increasing mechanization reduced the need for farm labor, pushing agricultural wages downward and rural unemployment upward. Madison and St. Leonard's parish suffered from this agricultural depression and from the Great Depression of the 1930s. During this time, the parish's population remained more or less stable: in 1918, it consisted of 440 individuals; in 1929, 452.

In 1926, the parish was forced to close its school, since the Presentation Sisters were no longer able to staff it. The school re-opened in 1931, with 60 pupils taught by Missionary Benedictine Sisters based in Norfolk.

The onset of World War II once again brought prosperity to rural Nebraska, and it persisted into the 1950s. St. Leonard's paid off its remaining debt, held a mortgage-burning ceremony in 1946, and began raising funds for a new school.

=== 1946–present ===
The cornerstone for a new school was laid in November 1953. A property adjoining the new school site was bought, and the house standing upon it converted to a convent for the nuns staffing the school. The new building was completed and opened for classes in August 1954; the old school, which had begun life as the first St. Leonard's Church, was demolished that fall, and its site became a parking lot.

The Benedictine Sisters withdrew from the school in 1978, prompting the closing of the seventh and eighth grades. The school continued to offer grades 1–6, taught by three lay instructors.

Beginning in the early 1990s, Madison experienced a large influx of Hispanics. In 1990, Madison County's population was 2% Hispanic; by 2010, the number had increased to 13%. In the city of Madison, whose single largest employer was a meatpacking plant with over 1000 employees, operated by IBP and then by Tyson Foods, the increase was far greater: the Hispanic fraction of the population rose from less than 1% in 1980 to 48.8% in 2010, as the Spanish-speaking population increased and the white non-Hispanic population fell. By 2011, an estimated two-thirds of St. Leonard's parishioners were Hispanic. Beginning in 1991, the archdiocese assigned Spanish-speaking priests to the parish, and both English- and Spanish-language services were offered.

The centennial of the church building was celebrated in December 2013, at a bilingual Mass conducted by Elden Curtiss, archbishop emeritus of the Archdiocese of Omaha.

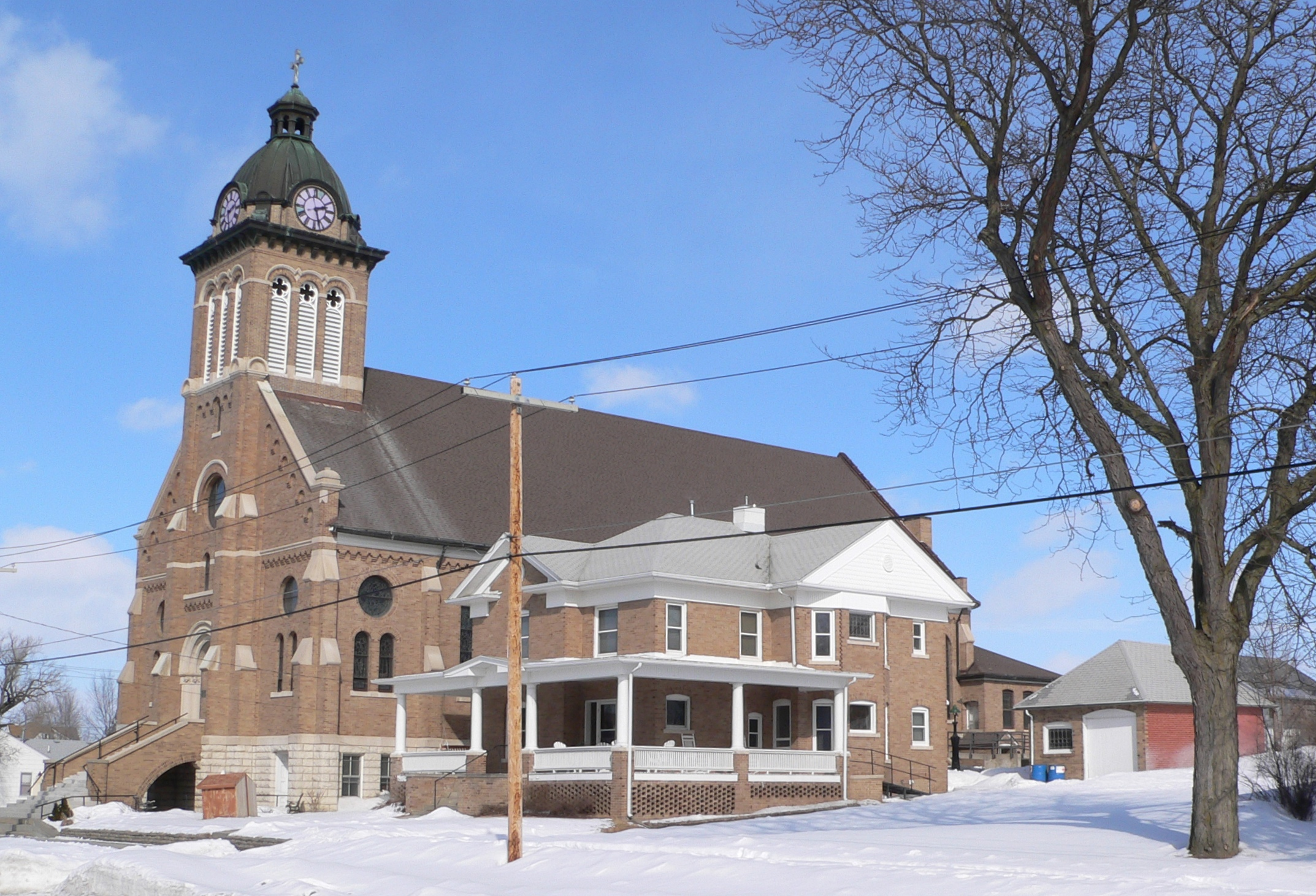
Church, rectory (foreground), and garage (right, behind tree)

== Architecture ==
In 1989, three of the parish's buildings—the church, the rectory, and the rectory's garage—were added to the National Register of Historic Places, as the work of distinguished Nebraska architect Jacob M. Nachtigall. Beside St. Leonard's, Nachtigall designed a number of other notable buildings in Nebraska, many of them Catholic; these include St. Mary of the Assumption Church in Dwight (1914), St. Anthony's Church in Cedar Rapids (1919), St. Bonaventure's Church in Raeville (1919), Immaculate Conception Church in Omaha (1926), and Father Flanagan's House at Boys Town (1927).

=== Church ===
The church is oriented east–west, with the main entrance facing westward. It is just over 153 feet (47 m) long from east to west; 52 feet (16 m) wide from north to south. The walls are made of mosaic gray pressed brick trimmed with Bedford stone, rising from a rock-faced limestone foundation, and are about 40 feet (12 m) high. The peak of the roof is about 70 feet (21 m) above ground level.

At the west end of the church, a 110-foot (34 m) belltower rises above the main entrance. The tower is topped with a copper dome, capped with a cross. It contains three bells, weighing 900, 1,600, and 2,500 pounds (410, 730, and 1,130 kg). The tower's clock has four six-foot (1.8 m) dials. Below the tower, a flight of seventeen steps ascends to the church's main entrance, via a set of double doors through a semicircular archway.

The church's north and south walls are supported by a series of buttresses. Seven windows run along each wall. A line of brick corbels runs along the walls below the eaves. Near the east end of the church, a short transept extends a short distance outward. At the church's east end, beyond the transept, is a semicircular apse with a conical roof, topped with a six-paned conical skylight.

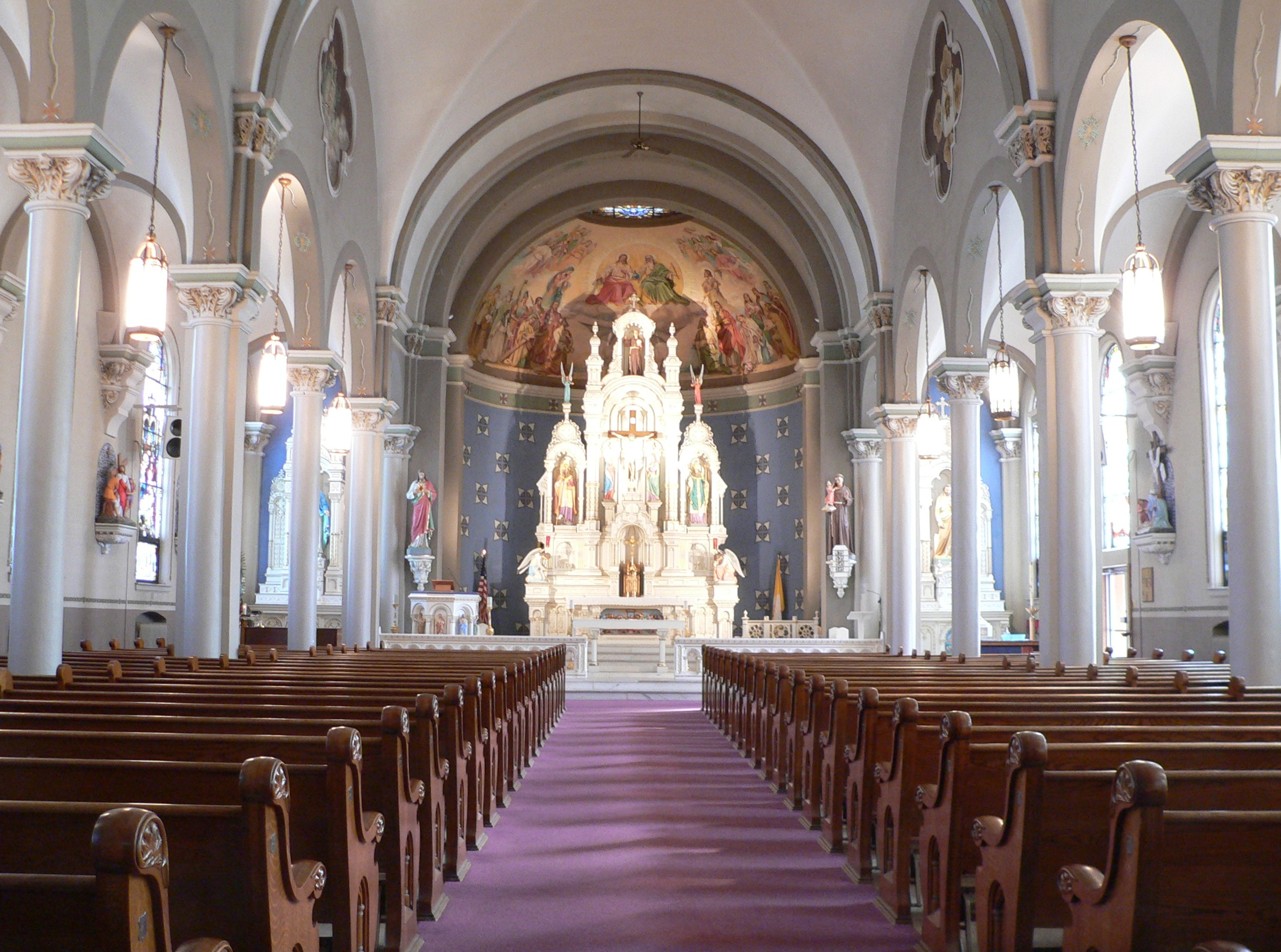
Interior of church, seen from the west

==== Interior ====
The interior plan of the church consists of a nave, a short transept, and a semicircular apse. At the west end of the nave is a narthex. At the center of this is a vestibule leading to the church's main entrance; at the church's northwest corner is a reconciliation room, formerly a baptistry; at the southwest corner is a short passage from which a staircase descends to the basement and another rises to the choir loft. In the loft is the church's organ, a tracker model manufactured by the Hinners Organ Company in 1879; the organ was not originally built for St. Leonard's.

The nave measures 98 feet (30 m) between the entrance and the communion rail. An aisle passes down its center; narrower aisles follow the north and south walls. Two rows of seven circular columns run along the nave. The columns are made of wood, plastered to conceal the material, and decorated with Corinthian capitals. The rib-vaulted ceiling rises 30 feet (9.1 m) above the floor. Fourteen stained-glass windows, depicting scenes from the life of Christ, occupy the nave's walls. The 13.5-by-5-foot (4.1 m × 1.5 m) windows were produced by the Muenich Art Studio of Chicago. Between the windows are sculpted stations of the cross. In three spandrels above columns on each side are fresco paintings.

Two marble steps rise from the nave to the chancel. At the top of the steps is a hand-carved white wood communion rail, decorated with miniature onyx columns and topped with marble.

At the northwest and southwest corners of the chancel are two side altars: to the north, a Marian altar; to the south, an altar of St. Joseph. The original image on the Marian altar depicts Our Lady of the Immaculate Conception; more recently, an image of Our Lady of Guadalupe has been added. The St. Joseph altar includes a bone relic of St. Leonard of Port Maurice.

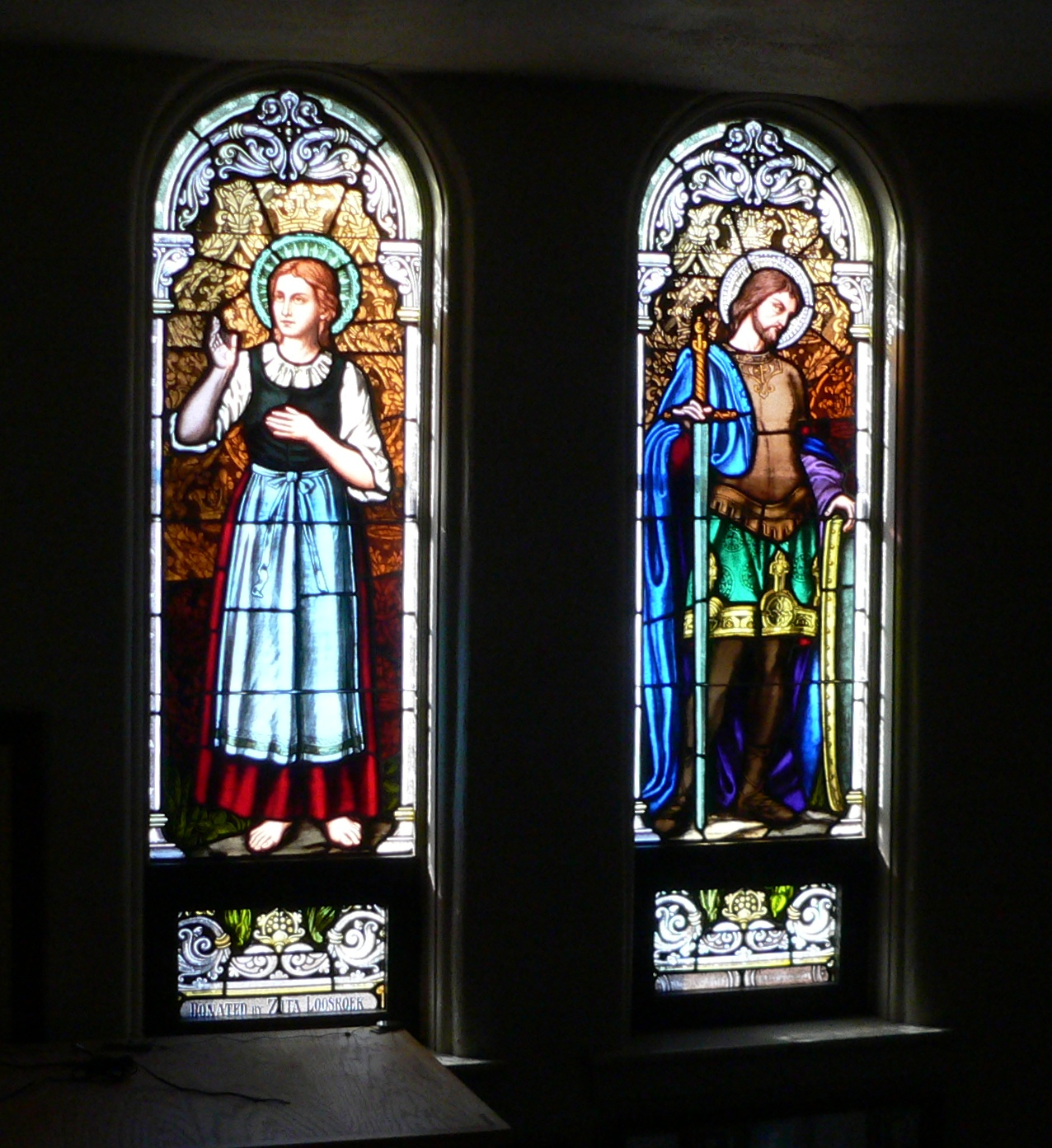
Stained-glass windows in southwestern anteroom: St. Zita at left; unidentified saint at right

On the Gospel side of the chancel is a large hand-carved wood pulpit, decorated with carved figures of the four Evangelists.

The chancel is dominated by the high altar, which stands over 20 feet (6.1 m) tall, and which cost its donors $2,080 in 1913. Like the communion rail, the side altars, and the pulpit, it is made of hand-carved wood decorated with small onyx columns. At the base is a relief sculpture of the Last Supper; above that is a marble altar table. The tabernacle is just above that; to either side is a sculpted angel, kneeling to the tabernacle and holding the sanctuary lamps. Above the tabernacle is a sculpted Crucifixion of Jesus, with the Virgin Mary and the apostle John on either side of the cross. In separate niches on either side of the crucifixion scene are statues of St. Boniface and St. Patrick, representing the German and Irish ethnicity of the parish in the early 20th century. Above their niches are figures of angels blowing trumpets; at the top of the altar is a statue of St. Leonard.

On the half-domed ceiling of the apse is a large oil-painted mural depicting a scene in Heaven. In the center, God the Father and Jesus are enthroned on a cloud; a stained-glass skylight at the top of the dome depicting the Holy Spirit completes the Trinity. Flanking the Father and Son are the Virgin Mary and John the Baptist. Below the cloud is Satan in torment. At the left and right of the scene is an assemblage of 18 Catholic saints and 10 angels.

Beside the fourteen large windows in the nave, there are 25 stained-glass windows in the church, depicting saints and symbols of the Catholic Church. These include St. Cecilia, patron saint of the Archdiocese of Omaha, and a pair of windows depicting St. Boniface and St. Patrick.

In the 1989 form nominating it for the National Register of Historic Places, it was noted that the church had undergone only minor alterations, including an interior redecoration in 1964, the replacement of roof slates with asphalt shingles in 1977, and the addition of a concrete ramp for access by the handicapped in 1986.

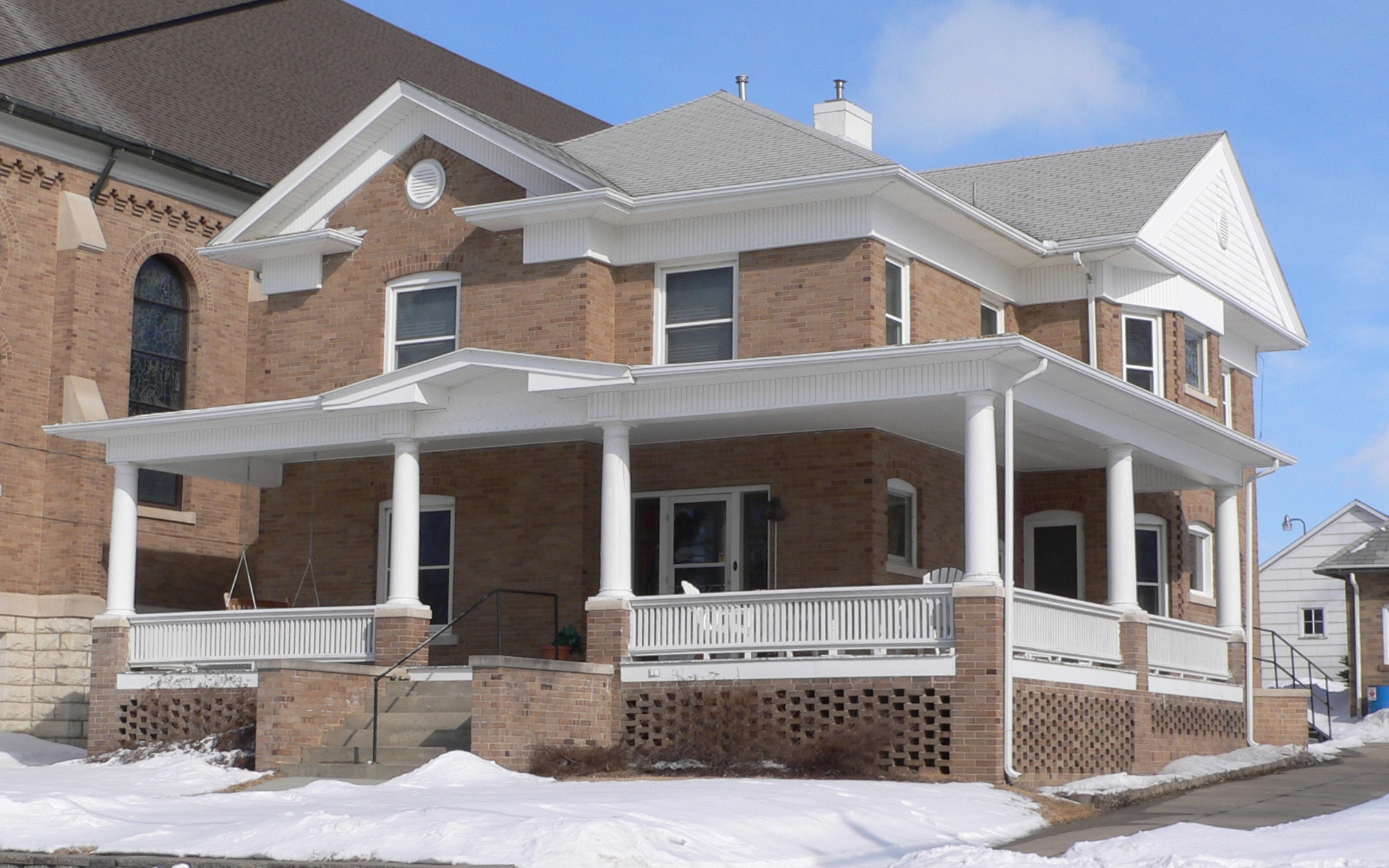
Rectory, seen from the southwest

=== Rectory ===
The rectory, located just south of the church, was designed in Neoclassical style, with Romanesque Revival elements. It is a rectangular house measuring 40 feet (12 m) wide by 57 feet (17 m) long, with eight rooms in two stories. Like the church, it is made of mosaic gray brick.

An open porch occupies the whole of the west frontage, facing the street, and wraps around to cover half of the south side. The portico is supported by circular columns with Doric capitals. At the base of the porch is brick latticework. There is a small enclosed porch with a doorway on the east side.

There are three rowlock arches above all of the windows on the first floor. One of the west-facing windows on the second floor has two rowlock arches above it; the other second-floor windows are rectangular. There are two circular window openings in the attic, one facing west and the other south.

The rectory has a sloping roof with overhanging eaves and wood cornices. On the south wall is a tympanum, filled in with siding.

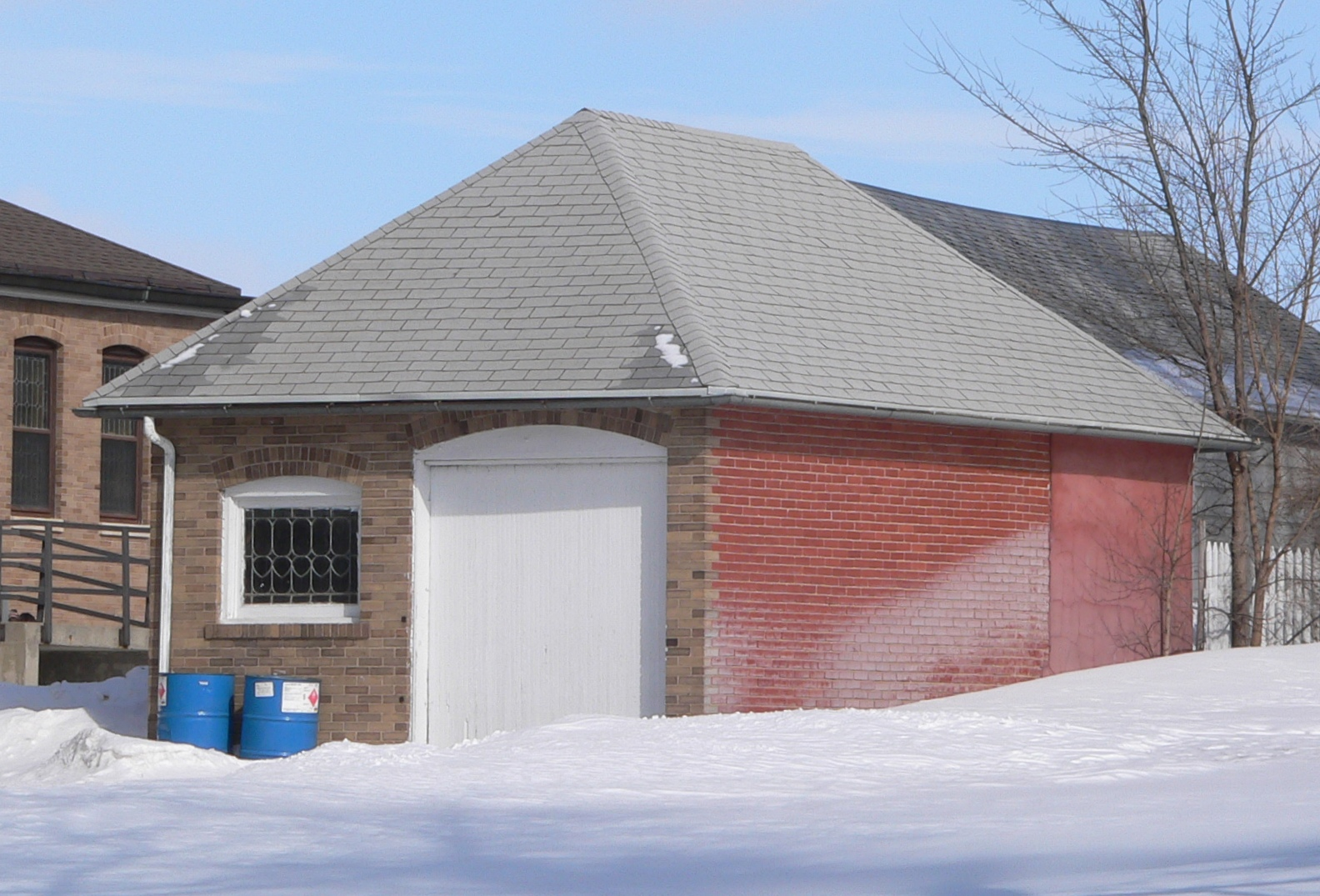
Garage, seen from the southwest

==== Garage ====
The original rectory garage is located southeast of the rectory. It is a rectangular structure facing westward, measuring 16 feet 2 inches (4.9 m) north to south, and 26 feet 4 inches (8.0 m) east to west. The interior is a single room.

The front (west side) of the garage is made of the same mosaic gray brick that was used for the construction of the church and the rectory. The north and south walls are both made of two different materials: the western two-thirds of them is red brick, possibly from the brickyard that once operated in Madison; the easternmost third is plastered with a layer of cement, painted red to match the bricks. The rear (east) wall is also plastered with red cement. It is speculated that the garage was either lengthened to fit a longer car, or that the eastern third had to be rebuilt; the building's hip roof shows no signs of having been lengthened.

The garage has two doors and two windows. Both the doors and windows have two rowlock brick arches over them. The car entrance is on the west side; a passage door is on the north side. A clear-glass window with 16 panes is on the east side. On the west side, north of the car entrance, is a window with beveled lead-glass panes, which appear clear from the outside but red from inside the building. It has been speculated that this window was part of the parish's first church.
