= St. Michael's Catholic Church Complex =

Historic church in Nebraska, United States

- U.S. National Register of Historic Places
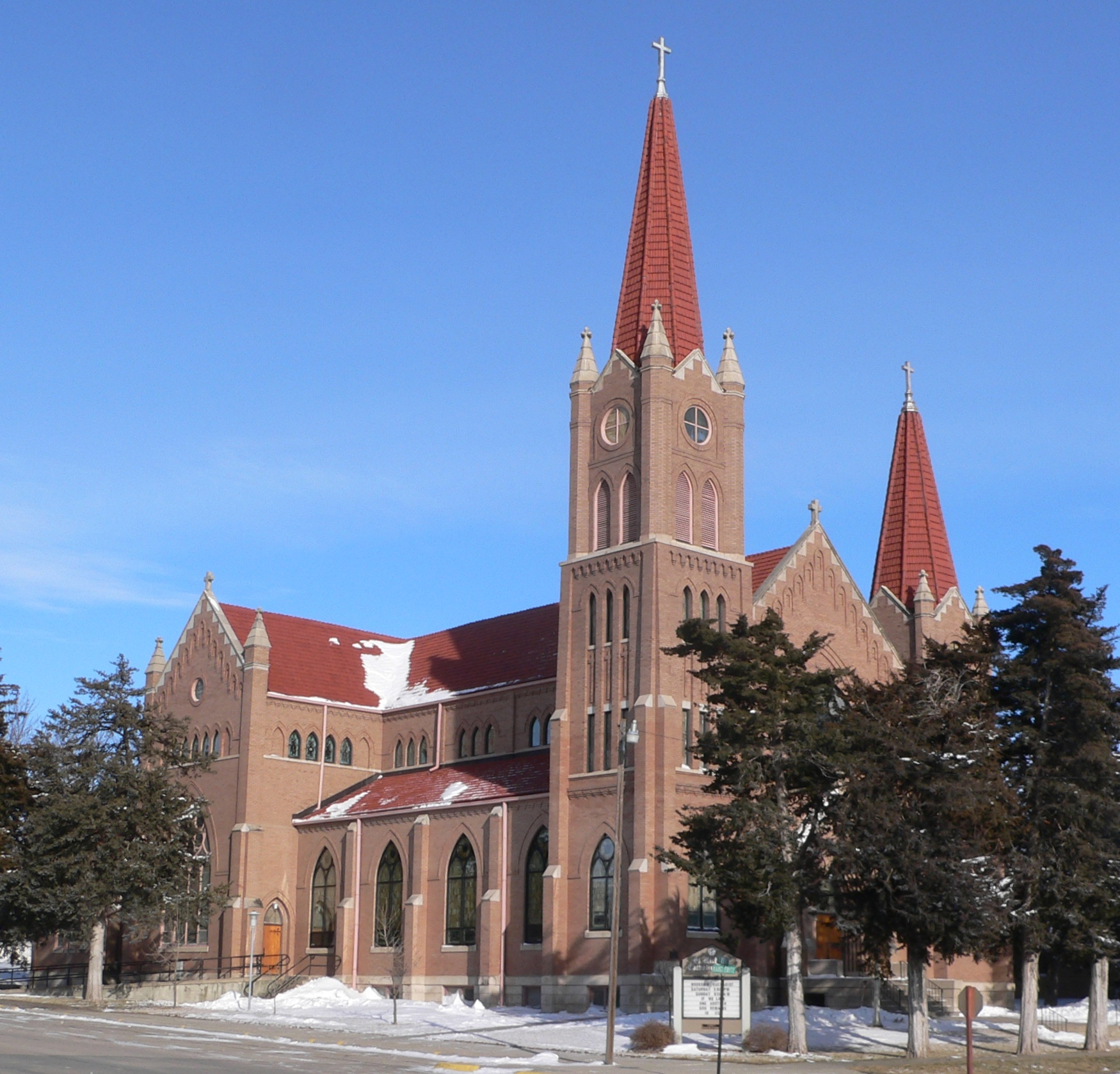

- Location within Nebraska Location within the United States
- Location: NE of Greeley Ctr., Spalding, Nebraska
- Coordinates: 41°41′25″N 98°21′46″W
- Area: 10 acres (4.0 ha)
- Built: 1909; 1914; 1926-27
- Architect: Craddock, J. H.; Nachtigall, Jacob M.
- Architectural style: Renaissance, Gothic Revival
- NRHP reference No.: 83003990
- Added to NRHP: December 15, 1983

St. Michael's Catholic Church is a parish of the Catholic Church in Spalding, Nebraska, part of the Diocese of Grand Island. It is noted for its historic buildings, notably the parish church, academy, and convent, which were added to the National Register as St. Michael's Catholic Church Complex in 1983.

== Architecture ==
The Gothic Revival parish church was designed by J.H. Craddock, modeled after a 13th-century church in Belgium. Built on a cruciform plan, it measures 152 feet along its north–south axis and 60 feet along its east–west axis, with two prominent towers flanking its main entrance on the south side. A rose window decoratively surrounded by concentric pointed arches is also situated on the south facade.

The building is mostly brick, including detail work such as hoodmold details above the portals and corbeling; the gable roof is covered with clay tiles, while its buttress weatherings, battlement copings, and water table are done in stone.

The academy building is a rectangular two-story brick edifice completed in 1912, a vernacular interpretation of the Renaissance Revival style. Gabled wall dormers with elbowed fronts and stone copings penetrate the roofline. A grotto to the east of the academy was erected by the Our Lady of Lourdes graduating class of 1937.

The convent building, built during 1926–27, was designed by Omaha architect Jacob M. Nachtigal. The main (south) facade displays an entry "pavilion" of wall pilasters visually supporting a pedimented front with corner battlements. The parapet wall shows a prominent wall cornice which arches at the pavilion and continues around the east and west facades.

== History ==
In 1879, the Irish Catholic Colonization Association was incorporated, following development work by James O'Connor, Vicar Apostolic of Nebraska; John Ireland, Bishop of St. Paul; and John Spalding, Bishop of Peoria. The association purchased 25,000 acres of land in northeastern Greeley County from the Burlington and Missouri River Railroad, with the goal of establishing a colony for Irish Americans fleeing harsh conditions in the east. The town of Spalding, named after Bishop Spalding, was established in 1881, and a small frame church was built the following year and dedicated to St. Michael.

The community soon outgrew the frame church, and a new brick church was built in 1890. It was dedicated by Richard Scannell, Bishop of Omaha on June 9, 1891. The first church was remodeled into a school, staffed by the Sisters of Mercy until 1900, and thereafter by Dominican sisters from Kentucky. A new school building and a new convent were completed in 1913 and 1927 respectively.

The congregation outgrew the brick church as well, and James Henry Craddock of Omaha was hired to design a newer building; Craddock also designed the Church of the Visitation in O'Connor. The cornerstone of the present structure was laid in 1909, and Bishop Scannell dedicated the new church on September 29, 1914.
