= Nachtigall =

Surname list

Nachtigall may refer to:

- Nachtigall Battalion
- Nachtigall is German for nightingale

== Family name ==
- Jacob M. Nachtigall (1874–1947), American architect in Nebraska
- Günter Nachtigall (born 1930), German Olympic gymnast
- Werner Nachtigall (1934-2024), German zoologist and biologist
- Vivant Victorius Fanciscus "Frantz" Nachtigal (1777-1847) Prussian/Danish founder of Physical Education Classes in Denmark.

== See also ==
- Nachtigal
