= Nachtigal =

Nachtigal is a surname. Notable people with the surname include:

- Gustav Nachtigal (1834–1885), German explorer
- Jacob M. Nachtigal (1874–1947), American architect, of Omaha, Nebraska
- Johann Karl Christoph Nachtigal (1753–1819), German theologian and philologist
- Ralph Nachtigal (1933–2014), American politician

== See also ==
- Nachtigal Falls, waterfalls on the Sanaga River, Cameroon
- Nachtigal Glacier
- Nachtigal Peak
- Nachtigall
