= Jacob M. Nachtigall =

German-born American architect

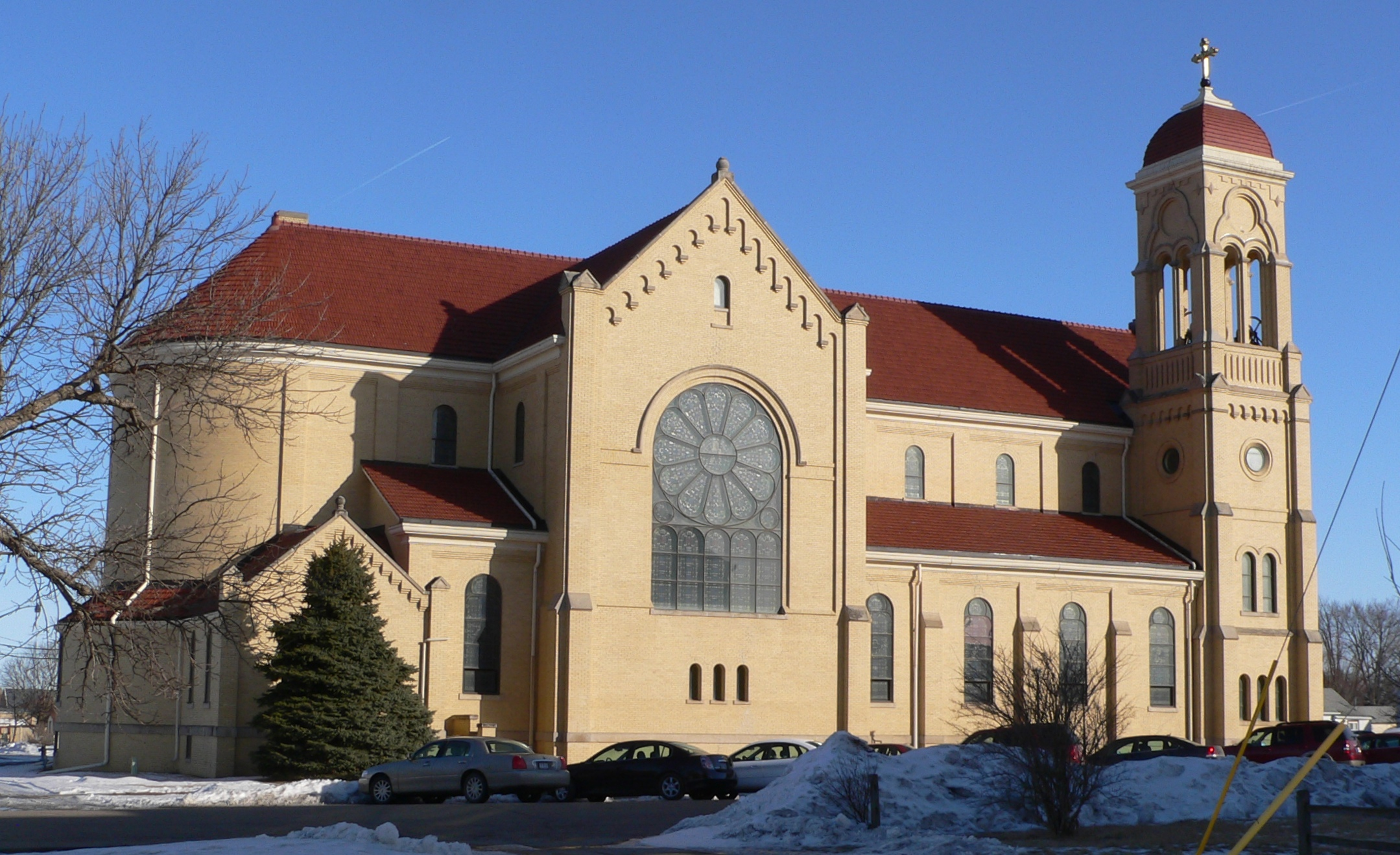
St. Anthony's Church and School, Cedar Rapids

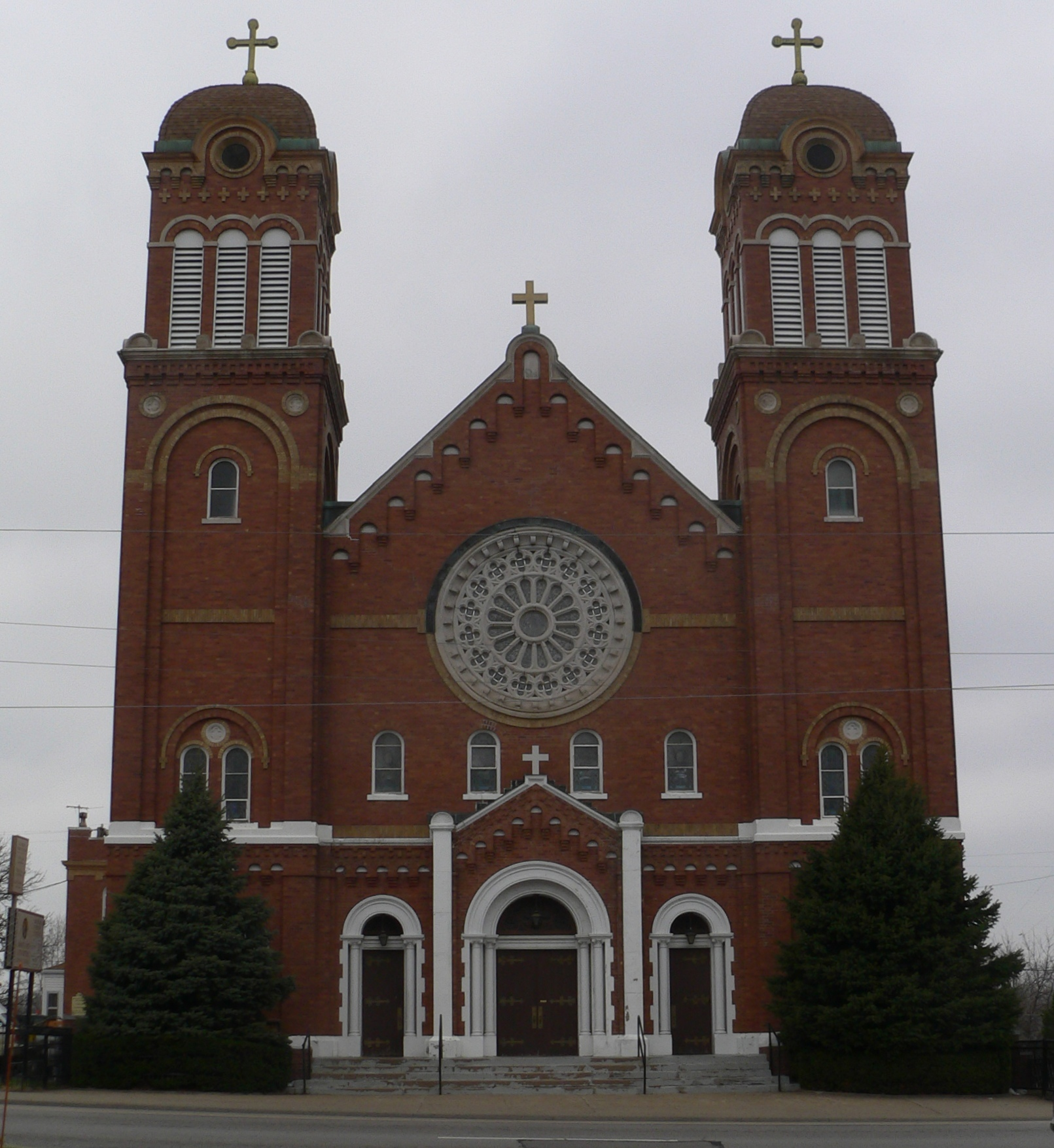
Immaculate Conception Church, Omaha

Jacob M. Nachtigall (1874 – 1947) was an American architect active in Omaha and eastern Nebraska. The surname is sometimes spelled Nachtigal. He designed numerous Catholic churches and other buildings in Nebraska. Nachtigall was born in Germany in about 1874 and came with his family to the U.S. in 1883. He apprenticed under Thomas Rogers Kimball (one of few professional architects in the state at the time) during 1900–1908 and went independent in 1909. A number of his works survive and are listed on the U.S. National Register of Historic Places. Works include (with varying attribution as given in sources):

- Father Flanagan House, off U.S. 6, Boys Town, NE (Nachtigall, Jacob M.), NRHP-listed
- Immaculate Conception Church and School, 1024 S. 24th St., Omaha, NE (Nachtigall, Jacob), NRHP-listed
- St. Anthony's Church and School, 514 W. Main St. and 103 N 6th St., Cedar Rapids, NE (Nachtigal, Jacob), NRHP-listed
- St. Bonaventure Church Complex, off NE 14, Raeville, NE (Nachtigall, Jacob M.), NRHP-listed
- St. Leonard's Catholic Church, 502–504 S. Nebraska St., Madison, NE (Nachtigall, Jacob M.), NRHP-listed
- St. Mary of the Assumption Catholic Church, School and Grottoes, 336 W. Pine St., Dwight, NE (Nachtigal, J.M.), NRHP-listed. The church, built in 1914, was designed by Nachtigal.
- St. Michael's Catholic Church Complex, NE of Greeley Ctr., Spalding, NE (Nachtigall, Jacob M.), NRHP-listed
- Swartz Printing Company Building, 714 S. 15th St., Omaha, NE (Nachtigall, Jacob), NRHP-listed
- West Point City Auditorium, 237 N. Main St., West Point, NE (Nachtigall, J.M.), NRHP-listed
