= Hinners Organ Company =

Reed and pipe organ manufacturing company

Coordinates: 40.5715°N 89.6514°W

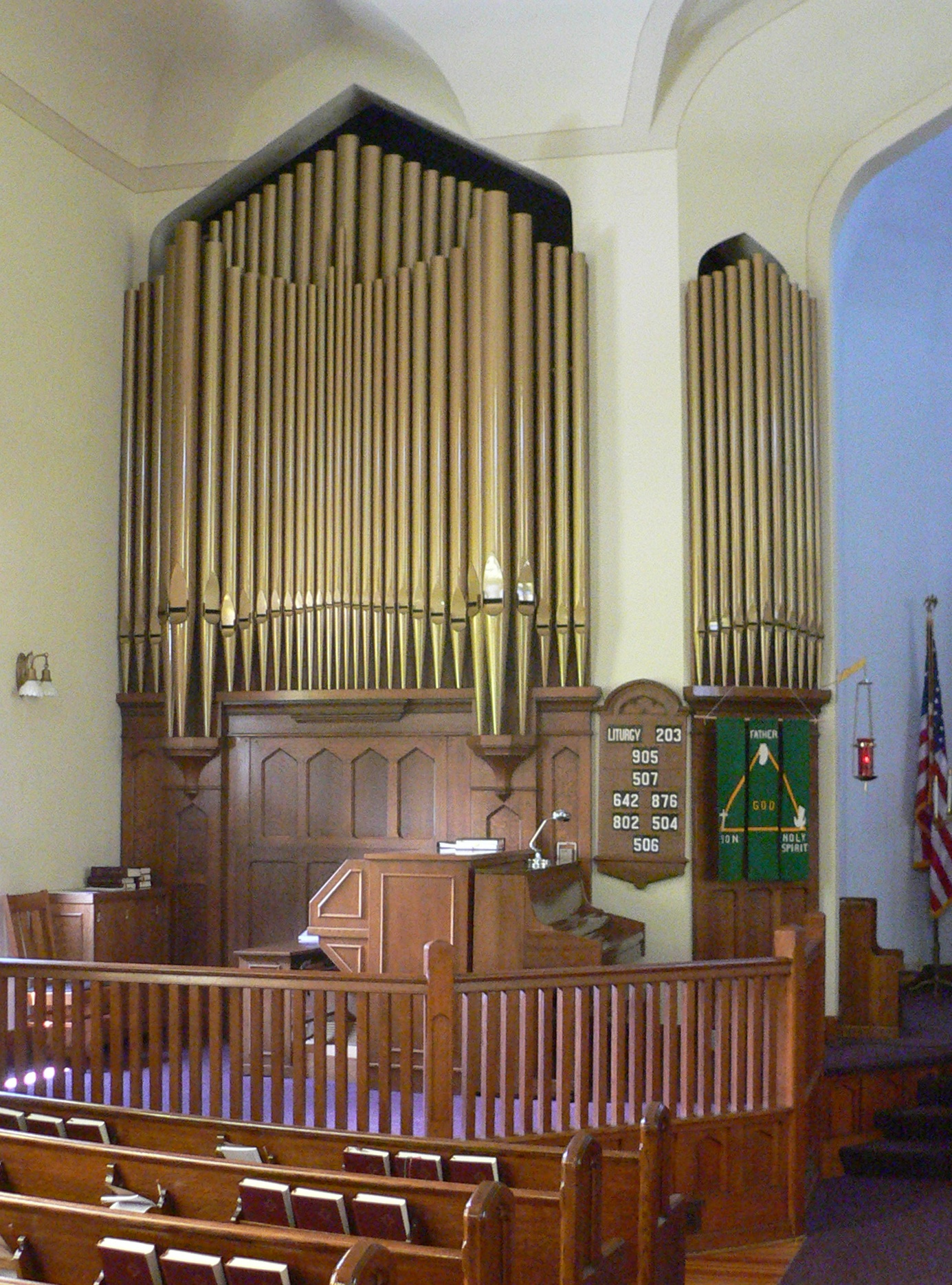
Hinners pipe organ at Our Redeemer Lutheran Church, Staplehurst, Nebraska (built 1917)

Hinners Organ Company was an American manufacturer of reed and pipe organs located in Pekin, Illinois. Established in 1879 by German-American John Hinners, the firm grew through several partners, becoming Hinners & Fink in 1881, Hinners & Albertsen in 1886, and Hinners Organ Company in 1902. In the 1920s Hinners established a subsidiary, the Illinois Organ Supply Company, which mass-produced parts for Hinners and other firms. Business declined in the 1930s due to the Great Depression, changing technology, and increasing competition. Hinners became a service company in 1936 and closed in 1942.

During its history, the company built over 10,000 reed organs and its pipe organ opus numbers reached #3097, including rebuilds and enlargements. The majority of its pipe organs were stock models of two manuals and mechanical action, with electro-pneumatic instruments introduced in the 1910s. Hinners also built at least 49 theatre organs and some larger custom projects, including several three- and four-manual installations.

Hinners was one of the first American mail order catalogue companies. Its focus on standard models, mass production, and direct marketing meant that even small churches in Midwestern towns could afford a respectable pipe organ. Hinners was also notable for high-quality construction that could be serviced by local craftsmen in an era before reliable roads and electricity. By being among the first to make his products widely affordable to ordinary people across rural America, John Hinners has been compared to both Henry Ford and Aaron Montgomery Ward.

== History ==
John L. Hinners (1846–1906) was the son of German Methodist Episcopalians and originally a carpenter by trade. He apprenticed at Mason & Hamlin in Chicago where he learned to build pump organs. In 1879, Hinners set up shop as the Perfection Organ Manufactury at the back of Schæfer's music merchandising store in Pekin, Illinois. When Schæfer sold his store, Hinners recruited investors to expand his organ building business. It became Hinners & Fink when J. J. Fink became partner in 1881, Hinners & Albertsen when Fink was bought out by Ubbo J. Albertsen in 1886, and incorporated as Hinners Organ Company in 1902 when Albertsen retired.

Hinners began building pipe organs in 1890. His primary customers were the many German-speaking immigrant congregations then flourishing in the Midwestern United States. Company literature was printed in both English and German, and German was the language used by workers on the factory floor. The earliest known instrument was built in 1890 for the German Evangelical Church in Edwardsville, Illinois. Because Hinners didn't consistently date and number his nameplates, the first pipe organ for which there are company records was installed in 1892 at the German Evangelical Church in Huntingburg, Indiana.

There is record of a nameplate that reads “Established 1879 Hinners Organ Co. Pekin, Illinois U.S.A” on the organ installed in 1891, at the original St. Bartholomew Catholic Church, in Columbus, Indiana. The organ remains, although it is non-working.

Unlike competitors who made each pipe organ by hand as a custom job, Hinners began building stock models and offering them by catalog without a sales force. His simplified manufacturing and distribution methods were specifically tailored so that small rural churches who wanted the grand sound of a pipe organ could afford one. The average cost of a one-manual Hinners instrument in the 1890s was about $100 per rank, including shipping and installation. If a church wished to reduce costs further, members of the congregation could pick up the organ in their own wagons at the factory. There was more variety to the company's organ cases, some of which were quite elaborate. This was an important selling point, as the organ was often the most prominent architectural feature in otherwise spartan country church buildings. Hinners was also known for high-quality workmanship that could be easily serviced by local craftsmen.

The company became a prolific manufacturer, building 10,000–20,000 reed and 2,000–3,000 pipe organs over its history. (Note: Estimates vary because instruments and company records have been lost over time.) Hinners pipe organ opus numbers are known to reach #3097. (Note: Hinners opus numbers also include rebuilds and enlargements of existing instruments.) The majority of pipe organs Hinners manufactured had two manuals with mechanical action, although many divided one-manual instruments were also made. The company began offering products with tubular-pneumatic action in 1910 and electro-pneumatic action in 1916. Hinners did build some large custom organs, including several with three-manuals and two with four-manuals. The company's peak year was 1912, when it had 97 employees and was shipping 3 pipe organs per week. Hinners organs were not only popular in the American Midwest, many were shipped abroad.

John Hinners' son Arthur took over as president in 1915. To further increase efficiency, he established the subsidiary Illinois Organ Supply Company in 1920, which mass-produced component parts for Hinners and other firms. Although some new product offerings were introduced, the firm did little to invest in new technology in subsequent years. Competitors began building newer factories, new customers were demanding larger and more customized instruments, and the company's target rural market began to decline. While Hinners provided the first theatre organ in Chicago in 1908, it failed to capitalize on this booming trend and made only 48 more such instruments. Increasingly viewed as "old fashioned", the company was already in a weak position by the time the Great Depression hit in 1929. By 1936 Hinners had built its last organ. It spun off its reed organ business and hung on as a service firm until 1942.

== Legacy ==
Hinners was one of the first American businesses to exclusively make use of direct mail order. All preliminaries were handled by letter, including design, customization, and financing. In a typical arrangement, a completed pipe organ would be shipped to the customer by rail or steamboat, and then a company employee followed to perform onsite installation. Just as Aaron Montgomery Ward first reached isolated rural customers with his mail order business in 1872, John Hinners was also among the first to realize these communities wanted better access high quality products. His early experiences as a church musician in small towns, and the inadequacies of the instruments then available, no doubt influenced this business philosophy.

Hinners' application of mass production and rigid controls on product variability also allowed the company to offer greater volume at lower cost. In this regard he has been compared to Henry Ford, wherein “Ford brought the passenger car to the common man while Hinners brought the pipe organ.” By making these complex musical instruments available to thousands of rural communities over its 56 years in business, Hinners was said to have "filled the plains with music".

The loud, romantic sound and mechanical action of Hinners instruments fell out of fashion by the mid-20th century. Many have disappeared or been radically altered such that they no longer resemble the original. Of the 30 Hinners pipe organs installed in North and South Dakota, more than all the company's competitors combined, only 15% survive. The first pipe organ in South Korea was a Hinners, and it was destroyed in the Korean War.

In recent decades a new appreciation has developed for these elegant workhorses. Prominent examples that still survive include Hinners opus 1024 (1909), the oldest pipe organ original to the state of Oklahoma. Once located at the German Methodist Church in Oklahoma City, it was damaged by the nearby Murrah bombing on April 19, 1995. It has since been fully restored by the American Organ Institute at the University of Oklahoma and re-installed at Trinity Lutheran Church, Norman, Oklahoma.

== Notable instruments ==
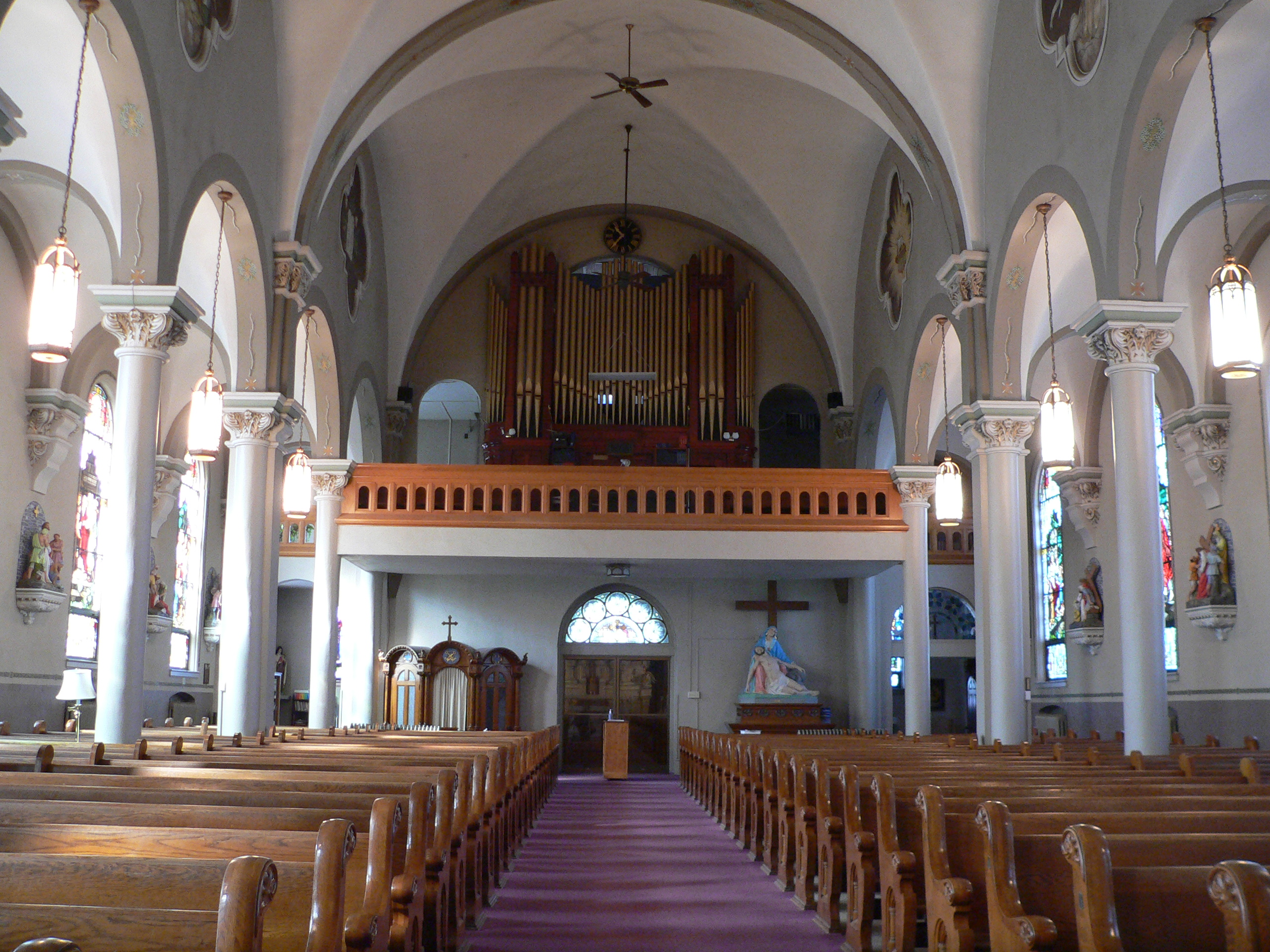
1916 Hinners Organ at St. Leonard Catholic Church, Madison, Nebraska

- Illinois Hall, Panama–Pacific International Exposition, San Francisco, California (1915)
  moved to St. Mary's Cathedral, Colorado Springs, Colorado (ca 1918)
- Holy Trinity Church, Bloomington, Illinois (1934)
- Presser Hall, Illinois Wesleyan University, Bloomington, Illinois (1935)
- Alcazar Theatre, Chicago, Illinois (1908), first theatre organ in Chicago
- Christ Temple Cathedral, Chicago, Illinois (1926), one of the largest Hinners organs
- Rock Rapids United Methodist Church, Rock Rapids, Iowa (1905), rebuilt by Dobson in 1977
- Trinity United Methodist Church, Des Moines, Iowa (1911)
- Prospect Park United Methodist Church, Minneapolis, Minnesota (1927)
- Trinity Lutheran Church, New Richland, Minnesota (1903)
- Our Redeemer Lutheran Church, Staplehurst, Nebraska (1917)
- St. Leonard Catholic Church, Madison, Nebraska (1916)
- St. Vincent de Paul Catholic Church, Bayonne, New Jersey (1930)
- Trinity Lutheran Church, Norman, Oklahoma (1909), oldest instrument original to the state
- Spring Hill United Methodist Church, Spring Hill, Tennessee (1915)
  The only Hinners organ in Tennessee and one of 4 of its type that survives
