= Trinity United Methodist Church (Des Moines, Iowa) =

- Trinity Methodist Episcopal Church
- U.S. National Register of Historic Places
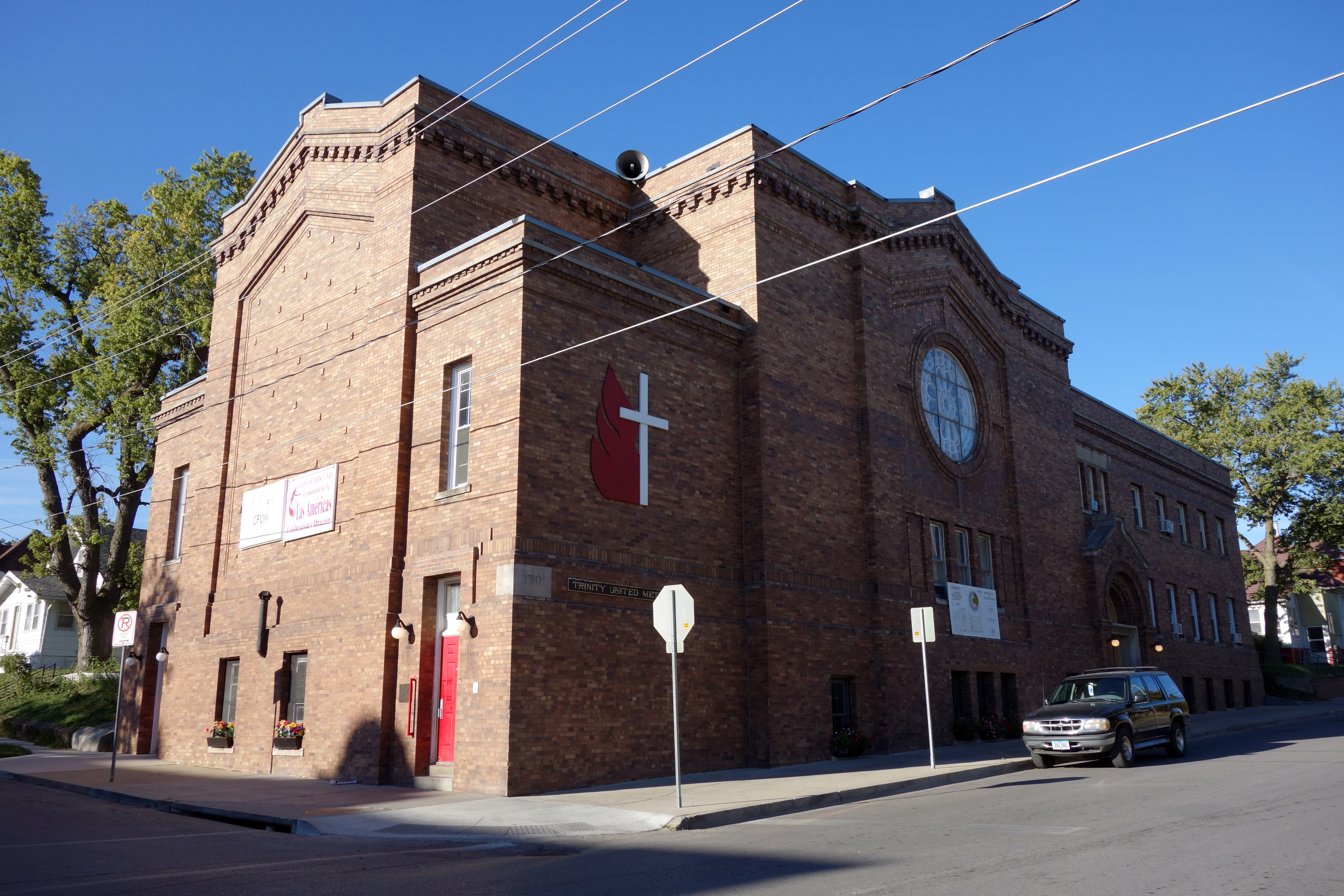

- Location within Iowa Location within the United States
- Location: 1548 8th St. Des Moines, Iowa
- Coordinates: 41°36′27.2″N 93°37′42.7″W
- Area: less than one acre
- Built: 1911
- Architect: Proudfoot, Bird & Rawson
- Architectural style: Classical Revival
- MPS: Towards a Greater Des Moines MPS
- NRHP reference No.: 98000380
- Added to NRHP: April 23, 1998

Trinity United Methodist Church is located in Des Moines, Iowa, United States. It was listed on the National Register of Historic Places in 1998 as Trinity Methodist Episcopal Church, which was its previous name.

== History ==
The congregation was organized as Prospect Park Methodist Episcopal Church when their first church building was constructed on the corner of Washington and Eighth Streets in 1887. It was named after the residential tract it was located in, in what was then the City of North Des Moines. The area and the church grew slower than expected so they changed their name to North Des Moines Methodist Episcopal Church in the hopes of growing their membership. It changed its name yet again to Trinity.

Trinity enlisted the architectural firm of Proudfoot, Bird and Rawson in 1910 to design the present church building. The Hinners Organ Company of Pekin, Illinois built the 17-rank tracker pipe organ when the church building was being constructed in 1911.

Since 1968 Trinity has hosted, with the support of the Inner City Cooperative Parish, a breakfast program to feed children from the neighborhood, which had been suggested by the local Black Panthers. An evening meal has been served since 1987 in collaboration with Our City Kitchen. In 1992 Trinity became the first “Reconciling Congregation” of a United Methodist Church in Iowa, by which it serves all people regardless of sexual orientation. A prison van ministry brings family members of those incarcerated in Iowa's prisons for visits. The Las Americas Comunidad de Fe, a Hispanic United Methodist Community, worships and studies at Trinity. The two congregations share a weekly bilingual service and a communal meal.

== Architecture ==
Trinity United Methodist Church is a Neoclassical style building built of brick. The interior features, a stained glass dome above the center of the sanctuary, a balcony that wraps around three sides of the sanctuary, and rose windows on the north and south elevations. Originally, the plaster walls were stenciled. The original pews are still in use.

Space for the pastor's office, a kitchen and fellowship hall are located in the basement of the church, and an education wing was also built to the west. A stair hall separates the sanctuary from the education wing.

Trinity is somewhat unique when compared with Des Moines' other churches. Along with First Christian Church on University Avenue, it generally covers the entirety of its site. Even the city's downtown churches have small lawns.

== Pipe organ ==
The church's pipe organ is one of the larger instruments built by the Hinners Organ Company. Located in the front of the sanctuary, hand-pump bellows originally provided the wind for the pipes. An electric motor has subsequently been installed. Overall, the instrument is in an unaltered state from its installation. Because of its high degree of historical integrity, the pipe organ is a contributing object in the church's historic designation. The organ features two manuals, three divisions, 18 stops, 17 registers, and 17 ranks. The manual compass is 61 notes, and the pedal compass is 30 notes. It has slider chests, mechanical action with pneumatic assist, and mechanical stop action. The organ has a traditional style console with an attached keydesk. Rounding out the features are drawknobs in horizontal rows on terraced/stepped jambs, and balanced swell shoes/pedals. The Combination Action is a fixed mechanical system. The organ has a concave radiating pedalboard.

Stop list:

GREAT (61 notes)

- Open Diapason 8'
- Melodia 8'
- Viola d'Gamba 8'
- Dulciana 8'
- Principal 4'
- Flute d'Amour 4'
- Swell to Great
- Swell Oct. to Great

SWELL (61 notes, enclosed)

- Bourdon Bass 16'
- Bourdon Treble 16'
- Violin Diapason 8'
- Stopped Diapason 8'
- Salicional 8'
- Aeoline 8'
- Voix Celeste 8' [also draws Aeoline]
- Flute Harmonic 4'
- Flageolet 2'
- Oboe 8' [labial; Hinners flat-front form]
- Tremolo

PEDAL (30 notes)

- Sub Bass 16'
- Bourdon 16'
- Great to Pedal
- Swell to Pedal
