= Swartz Printing Company Building =

- U.S. National Register of Historic Places
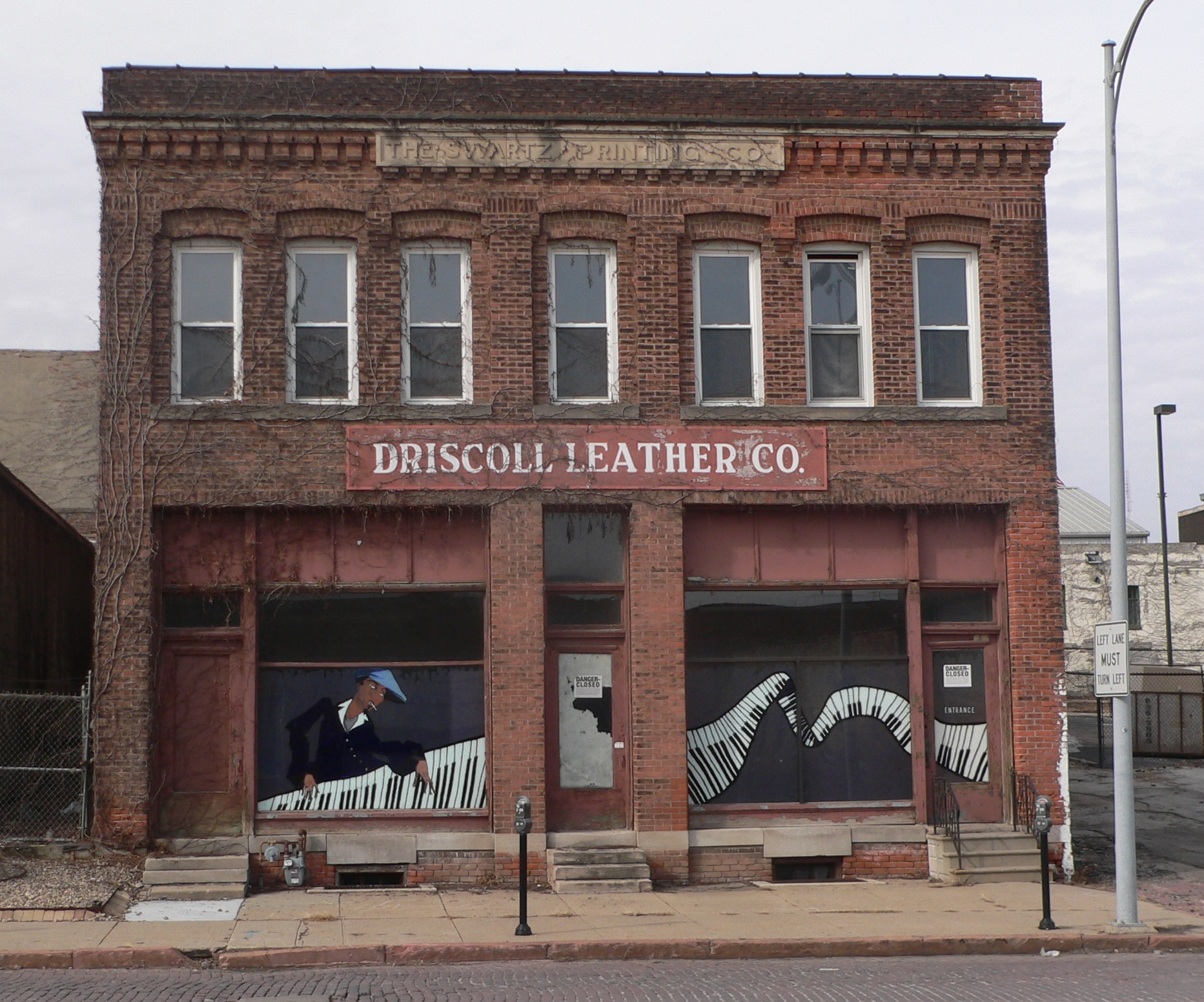
- The building in 2013

- Location within Nebraska Location within the United States
- Location: 714 South 15th Street, Omaha, Nebraska
- Coordinates: 41°15′10″N 95°56′09″W
- Area: 0.1 acres (0.040 ha)
- Built: 1910
- Architect: Jacob M. Nachtigall
- Architectural style: Early Commercial
- NRHP reference No.: 07000658
- Added to NRHP: July 3, 2007

The Swartz Printing Company Building is a historic two-story building in Omaha, Nebraska. It was built in 1910 for the Swartz Printing Company, a commercial printing press and book publisher owned by Maynard T. and Milton J. Swartz. The building was designed by architect Jacob M. Nachtigall. It has been listed on the National Register of Historic Places since July 3, 2007.
