= St. Vincent de Paul Catholic Church (Bayonne, New Jersey) =

Historic church in New Jersey, United States

- U.S. National Register of Historic Places
- New Jersey Register of Historic Places
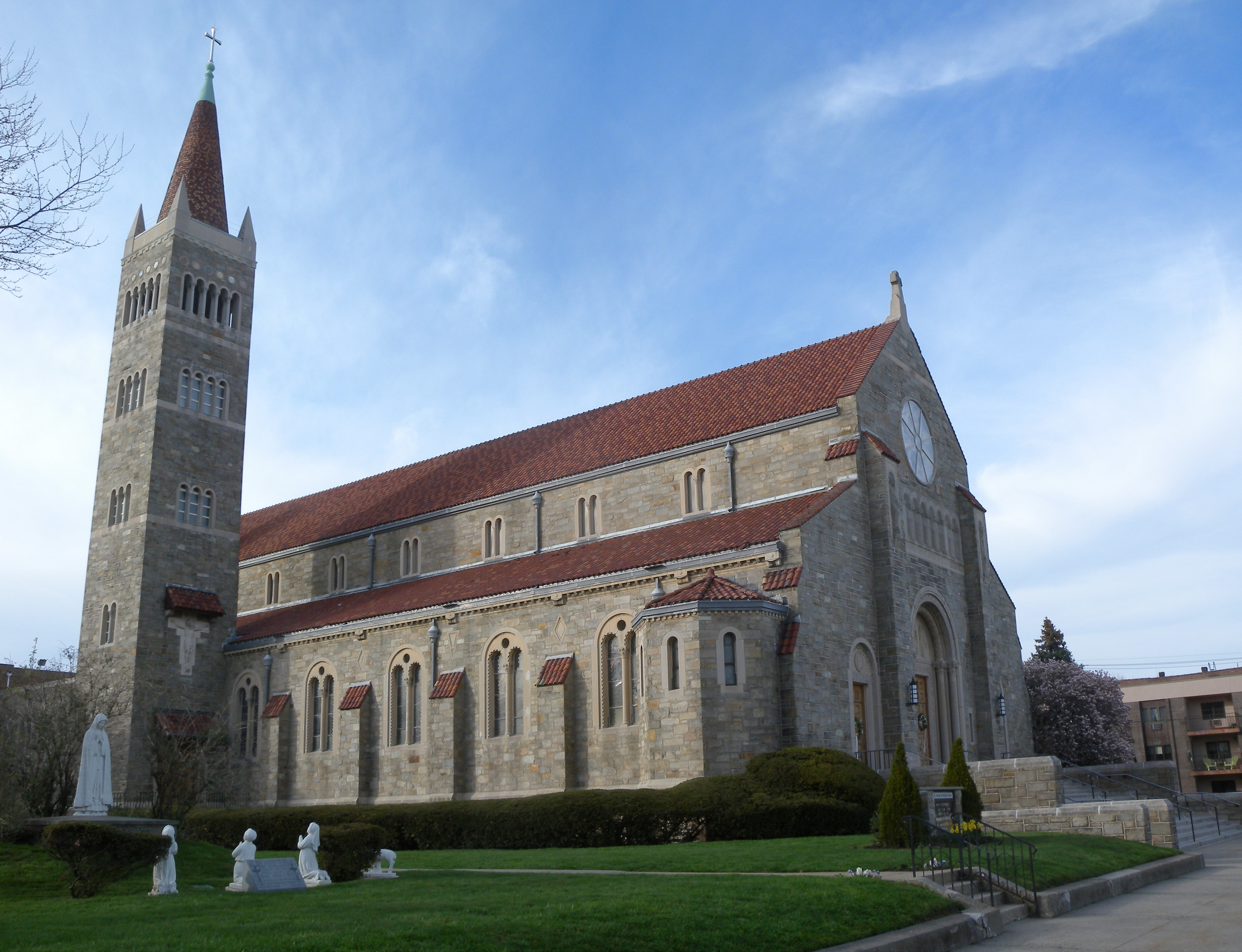

- Location within Hudson County, New Jersey Location within New Jersey Location within the United States
- Location: Avenue C and 47th Street, Bayonne, New Jersey
- Coordinates: 40°40′55″N 74°6′24″W
- NRHP reference No.: 11000590
- NJRHP No.: 4920

Significant dates
- Added to NRHP: August 24, 2011
- Designated NJRHP: June 3, 2011

St. Vincent de Paul Catholic Church is located in Bayonne, New Jersey, United States. It is an active parish of the Archdiocese of Newark, in Deanery 13. It is noted for its historic parish church, which was added to the National Register of Historic Places on August 24, 2011, for its significance in architecture and art.

The parish was established in 1894, primarily serving Irish, Scottish and German immigrants in the area. In 1905, the congregation moved from the rented hall it had been using to a new wooden Gothic Revival church. In 1927, work began on the current Lombardy Romanesque church, which was completed in 1930.

== Architecture ==
The building was designed by the ecclesiastical architectural firm Maginnis & Walsh of Boston. The granite Romanesque Revival style structure replaced the older Gothic structure, which was deemed impractical. There are more than 40 stained glass windows in the church and rectory that were made in Dublin, Ireland in the Harry Clarke Studio, in order to tell the history of the parish. No other examples of his work may be found in a church in North America.

The organ was built by the Hinners Organ Company in 1930. It originally had electro-pneumatic action and was rebuilt in 1993 with a computerized/digital system in 1993.

As a tribute to the early Irish parishioners that were the cornerstone of the Church the workers carved a Celtic cross in a cut-stone found at the top of the Church's front facade.

== See also ==
- National Register of Historic Places listings in Hudson County, New Jersey
