= West Point City Auditorium =

- U.S. National Register of Historic Places
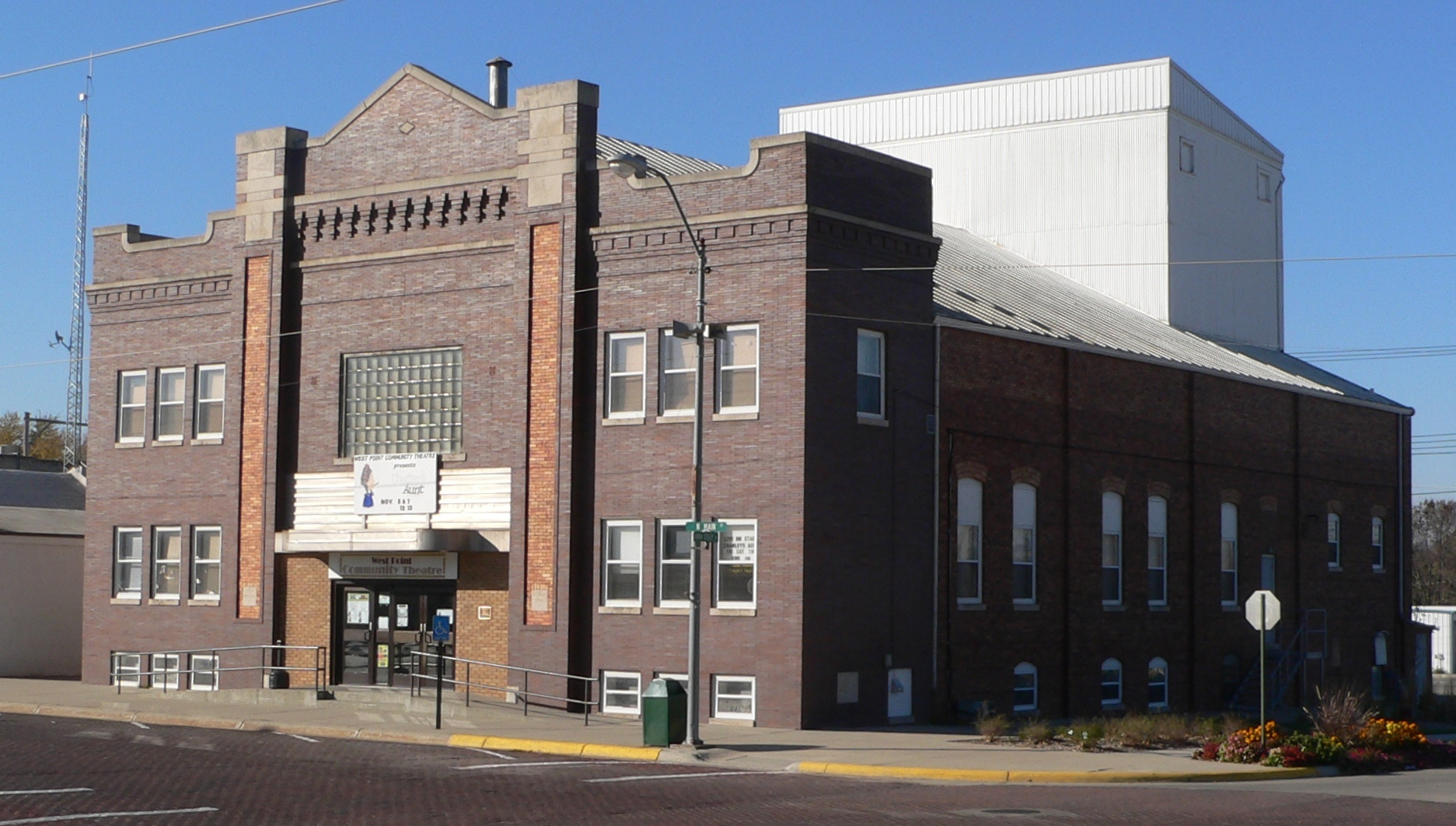

- Location within Nebraska Location within the United States
- Location: 237 N. Main St., West Point, Nebraska
- Coordinates: 41.841861°N 96.712417°W
- Area: less than one acre
- Built: 1911
- Architect: J.M. Nachtigall, West Point Cadet Band
- Architectural style: Early Commercial, Tudor Revival
- NRHP reference No.: 09000904
- Added to NRHP: November 10, 2009

The West Point City Auditorium in West Point in Cuming County, Nebraska was built in 1911. It was listed on the National Register of Historic Places in 2009.

It is significant as a local venue for performing arts and community events, financed by local donations and ultimately purchased by the city in 1945.

It was mainly designed by architect J.M. Nachtigall and includes elements of Early Commercial and Tudor Revival. The West Point Cadet Band was involved in the design of the auditorium, too, besides being integral to the community funding. It has also been known as City Auditorium and as Nebraskan Theatre.

It is a brick clad 120 by 60 feet (37 m × 18 m) building on a raised concrete foundation. It has a wood frame "fly loft" at the rear. The main section of the building has steel trusses and beams. It was modified in 1949 after the city took ownership in 1945.

As of 2017, some events are now held at the new Nielsen Community Center instead of at the auditorium. The auditorium is now used as a community playhouse and movie theater.
