= Holy Trinity Church Rectory and Convent =

Historic church in Illinois, United States

- Holy Trinity Catholic Church Rectory and Convent, Bloomington, IL
- U.S. National Register of Historic Places
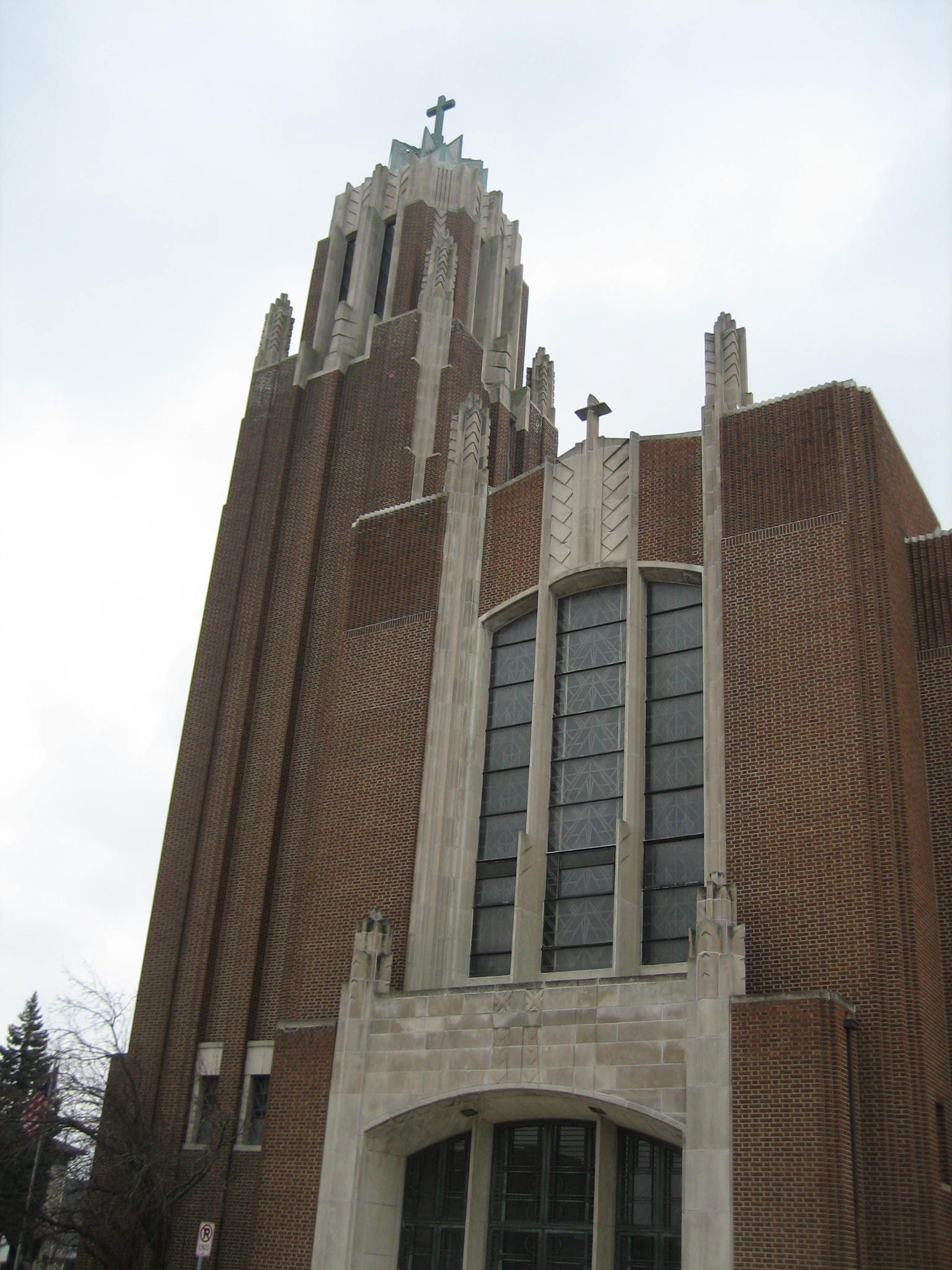

- Location within Illinois Location within the United States
- Location: 711 N. Main and 106 W. Chestnut Sts., Bloomington, Illinois
- Coordinates: 40°28′39″N 88°59′1″W
- Area: less than one acre
- Built: original church 1868 present church 1933/1934
- Architect: Arthur F. Moratz
- Architectural style: Romanesque, Art Deco
- Website: www.holytrinitybloomington.org
- NRHP reference No.: 83003585
- Added to NRHP: December 8, 1983

The Holy Trinity Catholic Church Rectory and Convent in Bloomington, Illinois, USA, has been listed on the National Register of Historic Places since 1983. The Rectory and Convent Building is situated behind the art deco church on the site of the 1869 Holy Trinity Church, which was destroyed by a tornado before it was completed. A fire obliterated the church in 1932, but the church was financed, and recovery was quick. The finished Art-Deco building was completed in 1933 and opened in 1934. It still stands today.

The church's pipe organ was the last large instrument manufactured by the Hinners Organ Company of Pekin, Illinois (opus 3074, built in 1934). The resulting instrument served until 1989, when the Rodgers Organ Company replaced it with a three-manual hybrid instrument with 8 ranks of new pipes.
