= Immaculate Conception Church and School (Omaha, Nebraska) =

Historic church in Nebraska, United States

- U.S. National Register of Historic Places
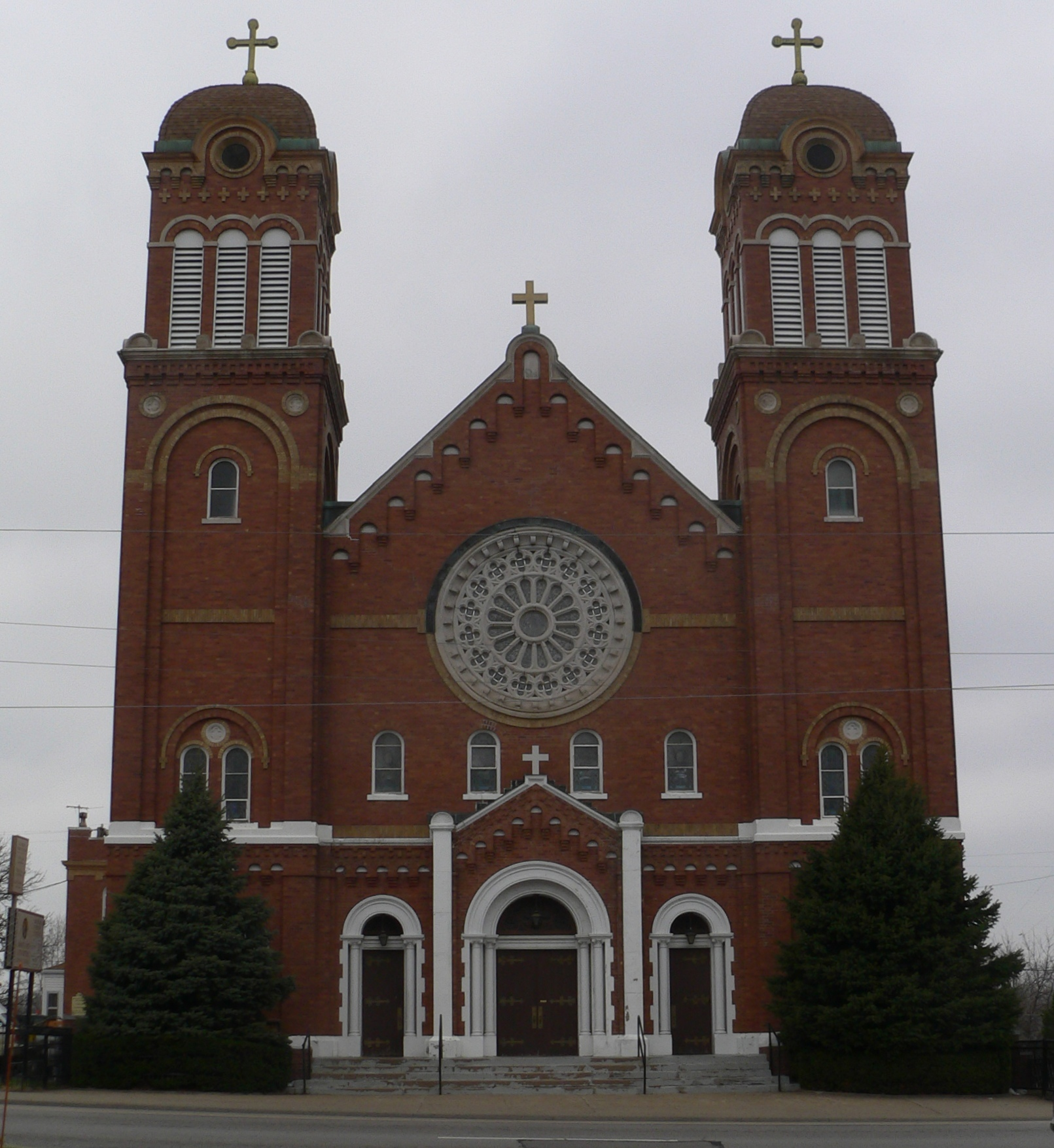
- Immaculate Conception Church, seen from the east

- Location within Nebraska Location within the United States
- Location: 2708–2716 S. 24th St., Omaha, Nebraska
- Coordinates: 41°14′1″N 95°56′51″W
- Area: 1 acre (0.40 ha)
- Built: 1912
- Architect: Jacob M. Nachtigall
- Architectural style: Romanesque
- NRHP reference No.: 98000390
- Added to NRHP: May 6, 1998

The Immaculate Conception Church and School are located at 2708 South 24th Street in the South Omaha area of Omaha, Nebraska, United States. The 1926 church and its former school building, built in 1912, were added to the National Register of Historic Places in 1998. Both buildings were designed by Omaha architect Jacob M. Nachtigall.

== Church history ==
Immaculate Conception Parish is part of the Archdiocese of Omaha. The parish was founded in 1898 and incorporated in 1900. Traditionally the home congregation for many Polish Catholics in Omaha, the present church was built in 1926 and dedicated on July 31, 1927. In August, 2007, Archbishop Elden Curtiss entrusted the care of the parish to the Priestly Fraternity of St. Peter to provide the Mass and sacraments in the traditional rites of the Catholic Church to any who so desired them. The first Traditional Latin Mass in over 40 years was offered on Sunday, August 26, 2007. A personal parish dedicated to the Traditional Latin Mass as encouraged by Pope Benedict XVI in his 2007 Motu Proprio Summorum Pontificum on the Latin Mass.

== Other buildings on the property ==
The Immaculate Conception School was located next door at 2716 South 24th Street in South Omaha, Nebraska. The school was sold by the church to private property management firm Guardian Real Estate in the mid-1990s and is now a low-income apartment building.

The parish still owns the I.C.C. Recreation Center, built in 1954 and located west of the Church. The center houses a wood-floor gymnasium with stage and kitchen (serving as the parish hall), a rentable party room and the I.C.C. Bowlatorium, one of the last church-owned and operated bowling alleys left in the U.S. The Bowlatorium is open for party rentals.

== See also ==
- Roman Catholic Archdiocese of Omaha
- List of churches in Omaha, Nebraska
