= St. Anthony's Church and School (Cedar Rapids, Nebraska) =

Historic church in Nebraska, United States

- U.S. National Register of Historic Places
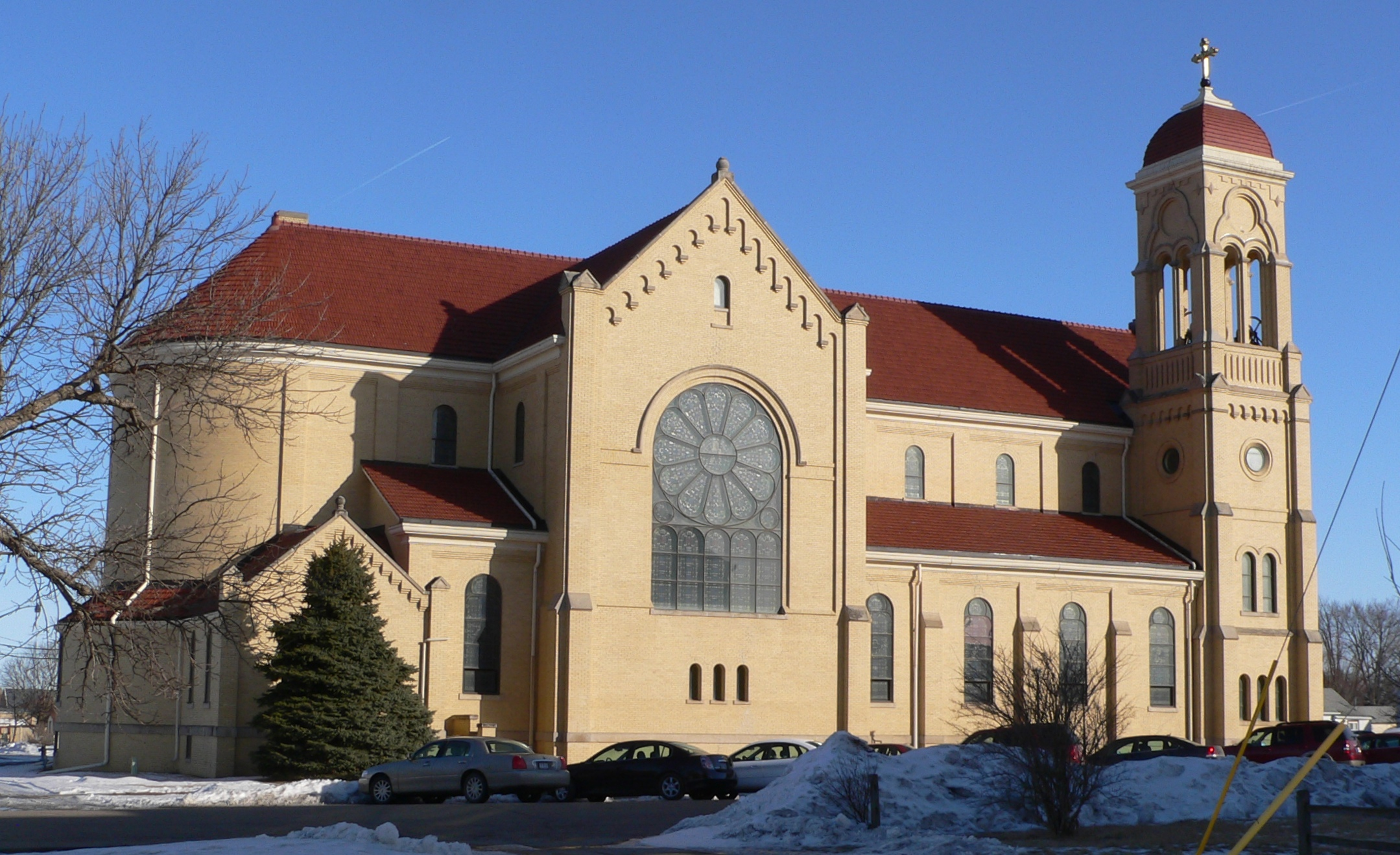

- Location within Nebraska Location within the United States
- Location: 514 W. Main St. and 103 N 6th St., Cedar Rapids, Nebraska
- Coordinates: 41°33′38″N 98°9′3″W
- Area: less than one acre
- Built: 1911, 1926 (school); 1918–19 (church)
- Architect: Jacob M. Nachtigall
- Architectural style: Romanesque Revival, Colonial Revival
- NRHP reference No.: 00000172
- Added to NRHP: March 9, 2000

St. Anthony's Church and School is a Romanesque Revival style church and an accompanying school at 514 West Main Street and 103 North 6th Street in Cedar Rapids, Nebraska within the Roman Catholic Archdiocese of Omaha.

== Description ==
Both the current church and the school were designed by Omaha architect Jacob M. Nachtigall. The school was built in 1911 and expanded in 1926; the church was built during 1918–1919.

The complex was added to the National Register in 2000.
