= St. Bonaventure Church (Raeville, Nebraska) =

Historic church in Nebraska, United States

- St. Bonaventure Church Complex
- U.S. National Register of Historic Places
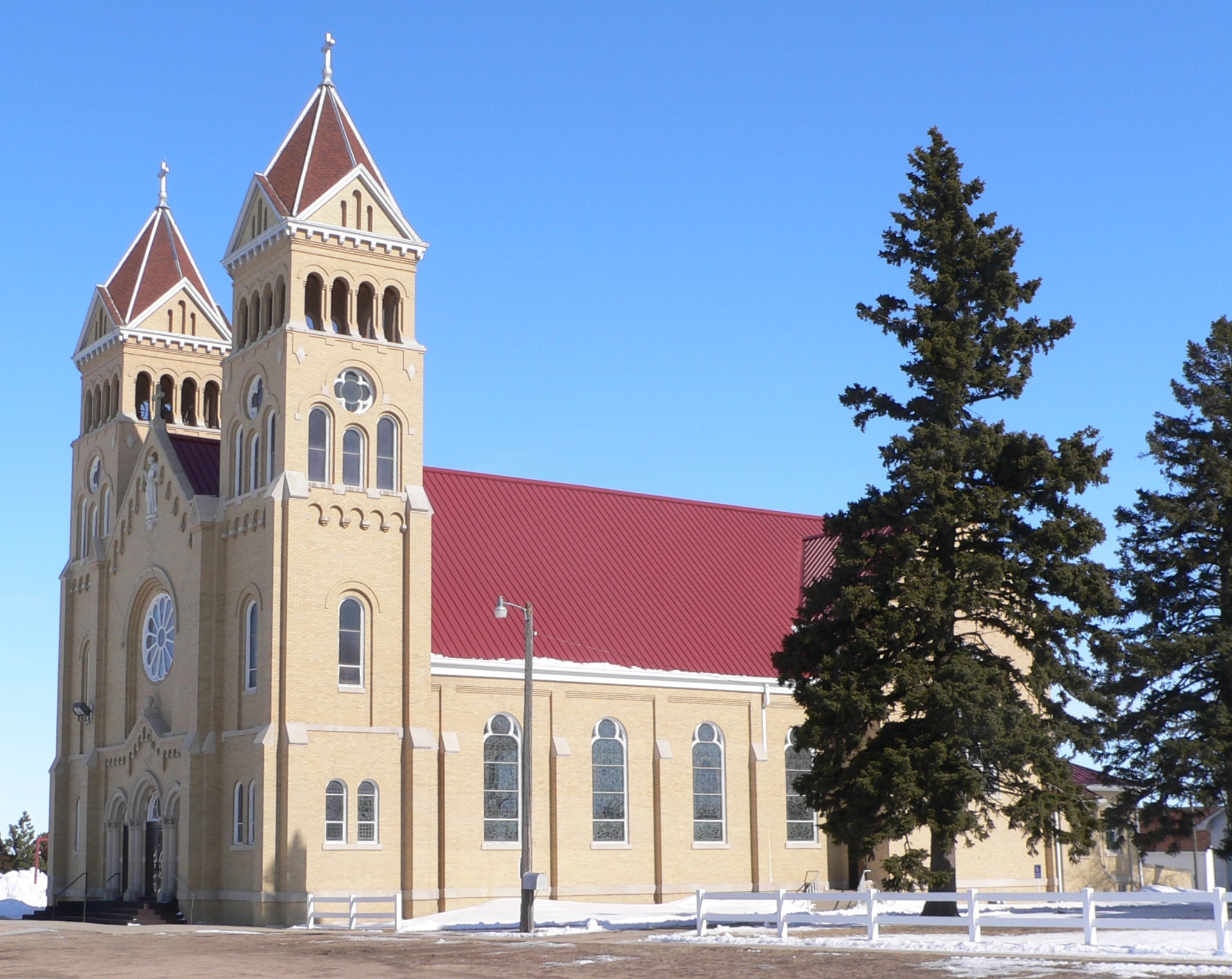

- Location within Nebraska Location within the United States
- Location: Off NE 14, Raeville, Nebraska
- Area: 12.2 acres (4.9 ha)
- Built: 1910
- Architect: Jacob M. Nachtigall (church); Joseph Guth (school)
- Architectural style: Colonial Revival, Romanesque, Romanesque Revival
- NRHP reference No.: 82000598
- Added to NRHP: October 19, 1982

St. Bonaventure Church is a church located in Raeville, Nebraska within the Roman Catholic Archdiocese of Omaha. in 1982, the church and associated buildings were added to the National Register of Historic Places.

== Description ==
The school in the complex, designed by Joseph Guth, was built in 1910. The church, built during 1917–1919, was designed by Jacob M. Nachtigall. A 1920 rectory is also included.
