= St. Mary of the Assumption Catholic Church, School and Grottoes =

Historic church in Nebraska, United States

- U.S. National Register of Historic Places
- U.S. Historic district
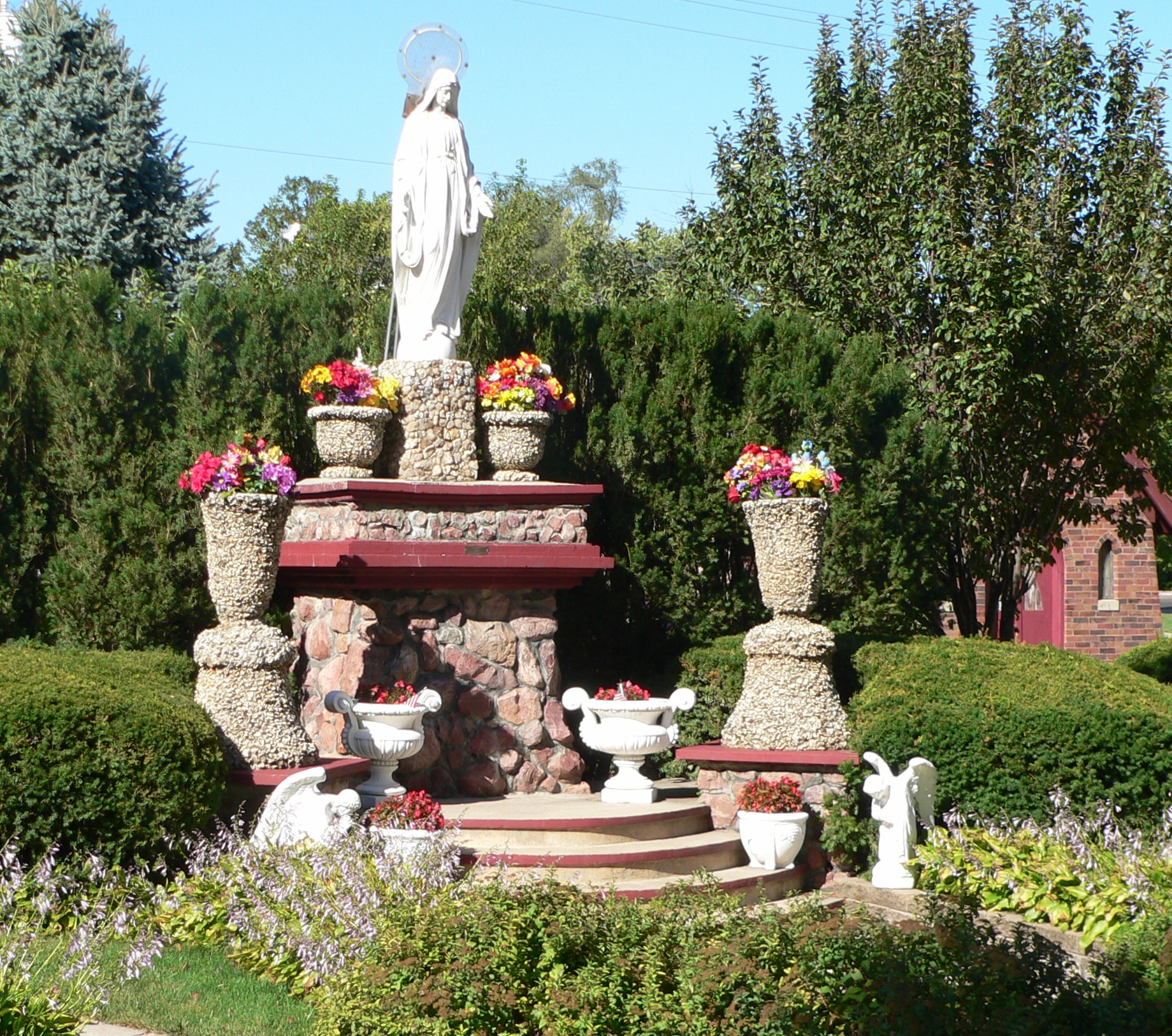

- Location within Nebraska Location within the United States
- Location: 336 W. Pine St., Dwight, Nebraska
- Coordinates: 41°5′2″N 97°1′22″W
- Area: 1.5 acres (0.61 ha)
- Built: 1914
- Built by: Olsen, Henry
- Architect: Nachtigal, J.M.
- Architectural style: Late Gothic Revival
- NRHP reference No.: 08001132
- Added to NRHP: December 4, 2008

Assumption Catholic Church is a parish of the Roman Catholic Church in Dwight, Nebraska, within the David City deanery of the Diocese of Lincoln. It is noted for the Late Gothic Revival architecture of its 1914 parish church and related buildings on its campus located at 336 W. Pine St. The complex was listed on the National Register of Historic Places in 2008 as St. Mary of the Assumption Catholic Church, School and Grottoes, denoted as BU06-001. The listing includes four contributing buildings and three contributing objects.

== History ==
The parish was established in 1899 with the erection of a small church. Construction on the present brick church began in 1910. The parish operated a school from 1921 until 1962, when it was closed and sold to the village.

In 1996, the parish hall collapsed after heavy rain. The present parish hall was built in 1999.

== Architecture ==
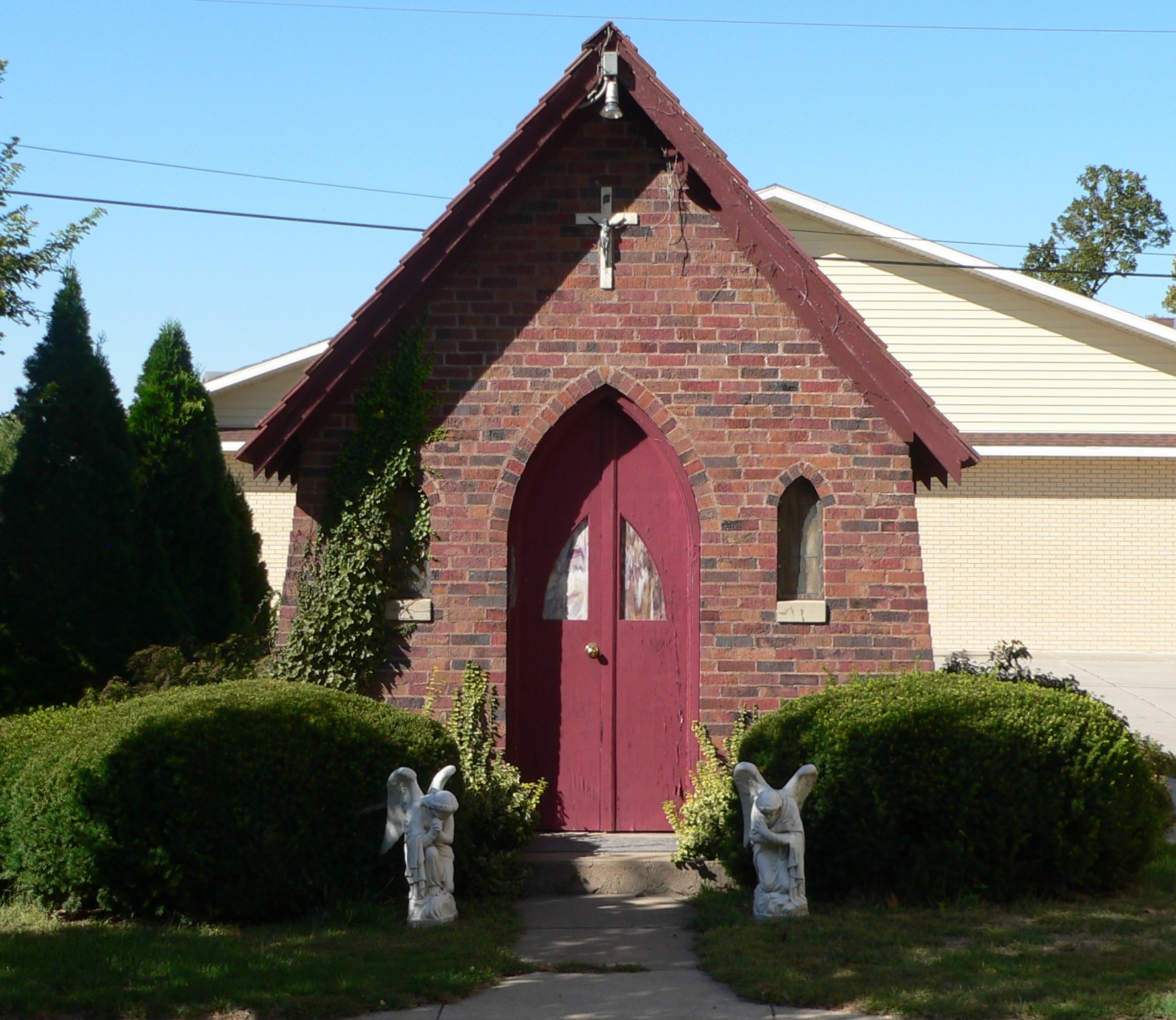
Garden chapel

The main part of the church, built in 1914, is about 155 by 43 feet (47 m × 13 m) in dimension. It was designed by Omaha architect J.M. Nachtigal and built by Henry Olson of Loup City. There is a 1921-built church school building, a 9-by-10-foot (2.7 m × 3.0 m) small chapel in the garden, and several shrines, fountains, and grottoes.
