= Spalding, Nebraska =

Village in Greeley County, Nebraska, United States

- Village
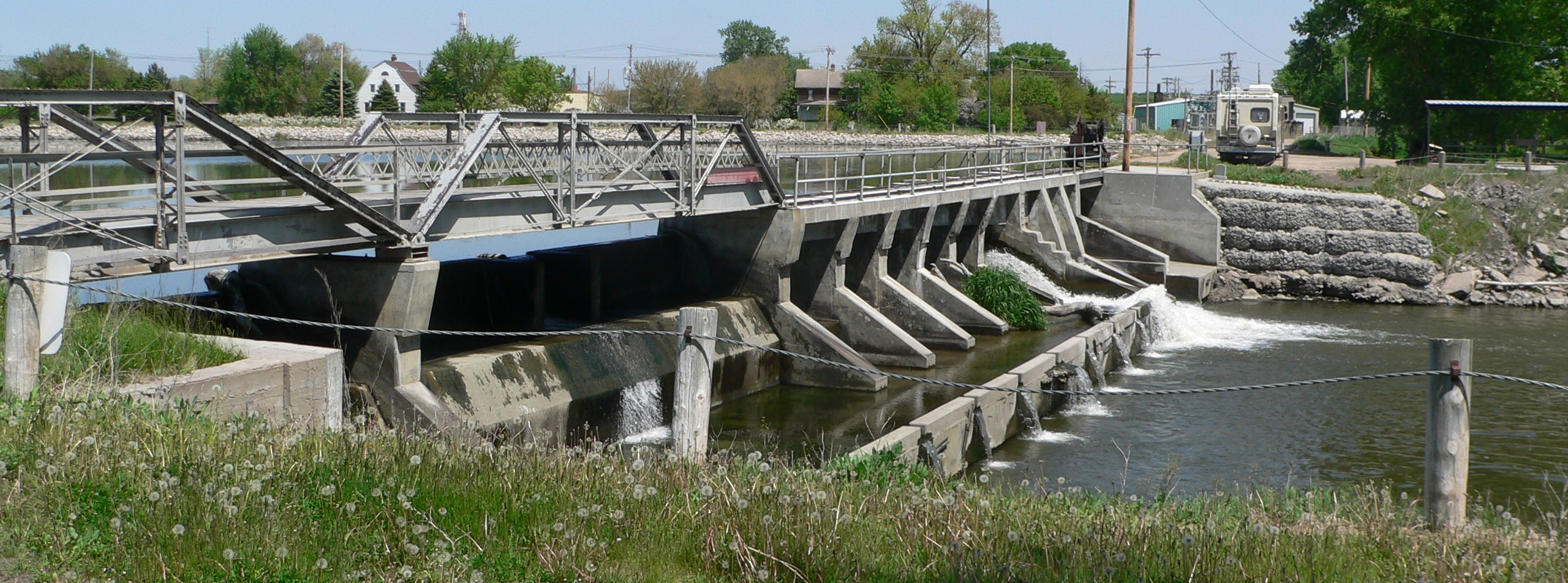
- The dam on the Cedar River at Spalding is listed in the National Register of Historic Places.

- Location of Spalding, Nebraska
- Coordinates: 41°41′21″N 98°21′45″W
- Country: United States
- State: Nebraska
- County: Greeley

Area
  - Total: 0.32 sq mi (0.83 km^{2})
  - Land: 0.32 sq mi (0.83 km^{2})
  - Water: 0 sq mi (0.00 km^{2})
- Elevation: 1,910 ft (580 m)

Population (2020)
  - Total: 408
  - Density: 1,271.0/sq mi (490.75/km^{2})
- Time zone: UTC-6 (Central (CST))
  - Summer (DST): UTC-5 (CDT)
- ZIP code: 68665
- Area code: 308
- FIPS code: 31-46135
- GNIS feature ID: 2399865
- Website: spaldingne.com

Spalding is a village in Greeley County, Nebraska, United States. The population was 408 at the 2020 census.

== History ==
Spalding was originally called Halifax, and under the latter name was founded in 1875 by a colony of Irish Catholics. It was renamed in 1881 in honor of bishop John Lancaster Spalding.

== Geography ==
According to the United States Census Bureau, the village has a total area of 0.32 square miles (0.83 km^{2}), all of it land.

== Demographics ==
Historical population
Census	Pop.	Note	%±
1900	148		—
1910	637		330.4%
1920	878		37.8%
1930	839		−4.4%
1940	830		−1.1%
1950	713		−14.1%
1960	683		−4.2%
1970	676		−1.0%
1980	645		−4.6%
1990	592		−8.2%
2000	537		−9.3%
2010	487		−9.3%
2020	408		−16.2%
U.S. Decennial Census; 2018 Estimate

=== 2010 census ===
As of the census of 2010, there were 487 people, 217 households, and 128 families residing in the village. The population density was 1,521.9 inhabitants per square mile (587.6/km^{2}). There were 254 housing units at an average density of 793.8 per square mile (306.5/km^{2}). The racial makeup of the village was 96.3% White, 0.6% African American, 0.4% Native American, 2.3% from other races, and 0.4% from two or more races. Hispanic or Latino of any race were 2.7% of the population.

There were 217 households, of which 21.7% had children under the age of 18 living with them, 49.3% were married couples living together, 7.4% had a female householder with no husband present, 2.3% had a male householder with no wife present, and 41.0% were non-families. 36.9% of all households were made up of individuals, and 16.6% had someone living alone who was 65 years of age or older. The average household size was 2.13 and the average family size was 2.80.

The median age in the village was 49.2 years. 19.3% of residents were under the age of 18; 6.7% were between the ages of 18 and 24; 17.4% were from 25 to 44; 29.2% were from 45 to 64; and 27.3% were 65 years of age or older. The gender makeup of the village was 48.0% male and 52.0% female.

=== 2000 census ===
As of the census of 2000, there were 537 people, 220 households, and 137 families residing in the village. The population density was 1,581.5 inhabitants per square mile (610.6/km^{2}). There were 244 housing units at an average density of 718.6 per square mile (277.5/km^{2}). The racial makeup of the village was 98.88% White, 0.19% African American, 0.74% from other races, and 0.19% from two or more races. Hispanic or Latino of any race were 0.74% of the population.

There were 220 households, out of which 24.1% had children under the age of 18 living with them, 50.9% were married couples living together, 9.1% had a female householder with no husband present, and 37.7% were non-families. 36.8% of all households were made up of individuals, and 22.7% had someone living alone who was 65 years of age or older. The average household size was 2.30 and the average family size was 3.01.

In the village, the population was spread out, with 23.3% under the age of 18, 6.7% from 18 to 24, 19.2% from 25 to 44, 20.7% from 45 to 64, and 30.2% who were 65 years of age or older. The median age was 46 years. For every 100 females, there were 83.9 males. For every 100 females age 18 and over, there were 82.3 males.

As of 2000 the median income for a household in the village was $27,039, and the median income for a family was $35,729. Males had a median income of $21,184 versus $18,125 for females. The per capita income for the village was $16,087. About 6.8% of families and 9.8% of the population were below the poverty line, including 16.3% of those under age 18 and 7.9% of those age 65 or over.

== Notable natives ==
- Crystal Carson - Acting coach and former actress.
- Gene Cronin - Former defensive end in the National Football League.
- Chuck, Jim, and Tompall Glaser, members of the country music group Tompall & the Glaser Brothers

== See also ==
- List of municipalities in Nebraska
