= Raeville, Nebraska =

- village
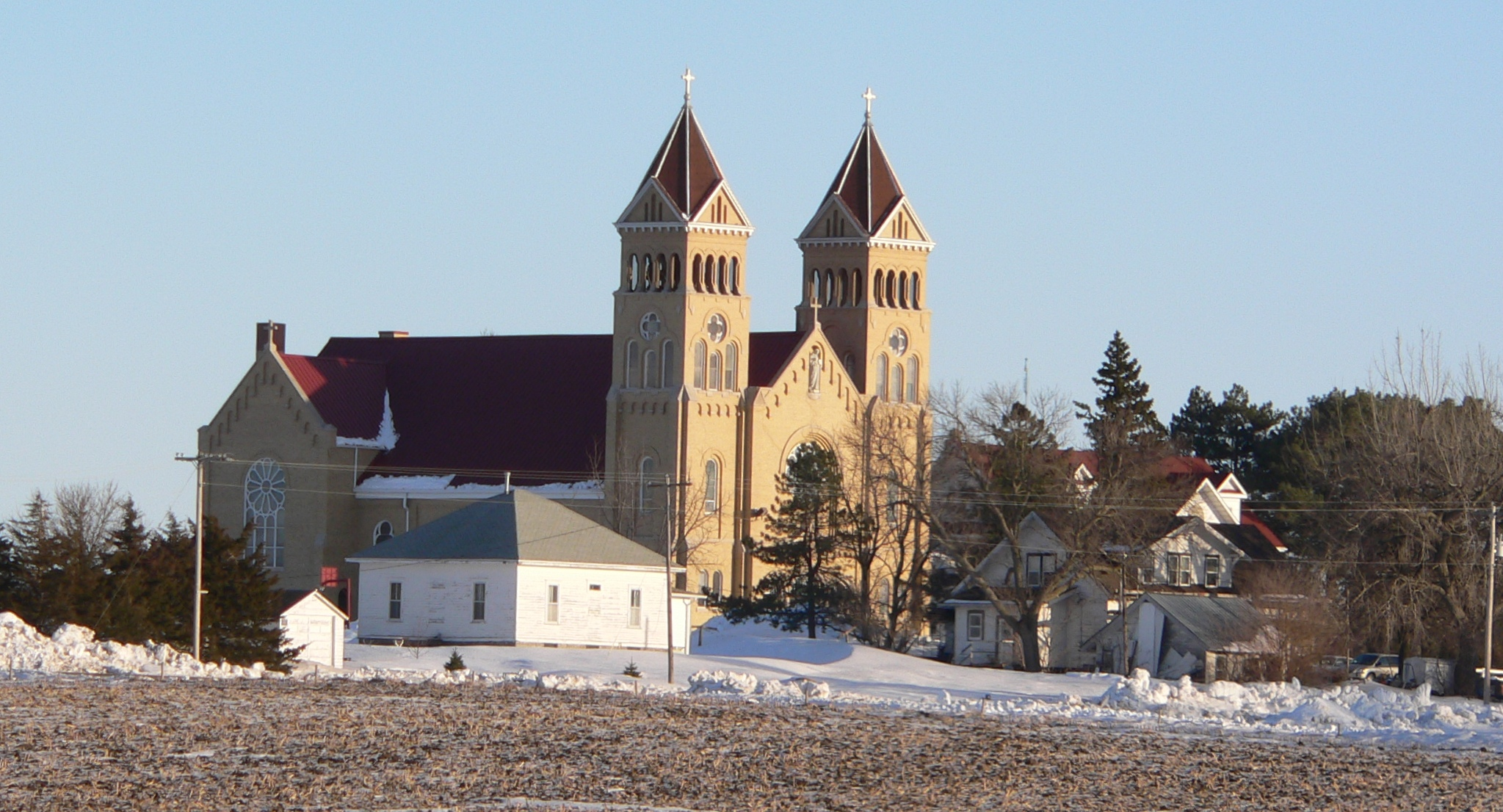
- St. Bonaventure complex in Raeville

- Location within the state of Nebraska
- Coordinates: 41°53′44″N 98°03′13″W
- Country: United States
- State: Nebraska
- County: Boone

Area
  - Total: 0.050 sq mi (0.13 km^{2})
  - Land: 0.050 sq mi (0.13 km^{2})
  - Water: 0 sq mi (0.00 km^{2})
- Elevation: 1,939 ft (591 m)

Population (2020)
  - Total: 18
  - Density: 362/sq mi (139.9/km^{2})
- Time zone: UTC-6 (Central (CST))
  - Summer (DST): UTC-5 (CDT)
- FIPS code: 31-40535
- GNIS feature ID: 2612513

Raeville is an unincorporated village, and part of a namesake census-designated place, in Boone County, Nebraska, United States. As of the 2020 census, the community had a population of 18. Raeville is the location of the still-active St. Bonaventure Church Complex, which is on the National Register of Historic Places. The community consists of that and three privately owned farms.

== History ==
A post office was established at Raeville in 1884, closed in 1887, reopened in 1918, and reclosed in 1982. According to tradition, the village was named for two brothers surnamed Rae.

== Geography ==
According to the United States Census Bureau, the community has a total area of 0.05 square mile (0.13 km^{2}), all land.

== Demographics ==
Historical population
Census	Pop.	Note	%±
2020	18		—
U.S. Decennial Census

As of the census of 2000, there were 26 people, 12 households, and 6 families residing in the community. The population density was 514.6 inhabitants per square mile (198.7/km^{2}). There were 14 housing units at an average density of 277.1 per square mile (107.0/km^{2}). The racial makeup of the village was 100.00% White.

There were 12 households, out of which 25.0% had children under the age of 18 living with them, 50.0% were married couples living together, and 50.0% were non-families. 41.7% of all households were made up of individuals, and 25.0% had someone living alone who was 65 years of age or older. The average household size was 1.89 and the average family size was 2.33.

In the community the population was spread out, with 23.1% under the age of 18, 34.6% from 25 to 44, 23.1% from 45 to 64, and 19.2% who were 65 years of age or older. The median age was 52.5 years. For every 100 females, there were 100 males. For every 100 females age 18 and over, there were 100 males.
