= Goulty =

Goulty is a surname. Notable people with the surname include:

- Alan Goulty (born 1947), British diplomat
- Horatio Nelson Goulty (1832/33–1869), English architect
- John Nelson Goulty (1788–1870), English Nonconformist Christian pastor
