= Norfolk Daily News =

Newspaper in Norfolk, Nebraska

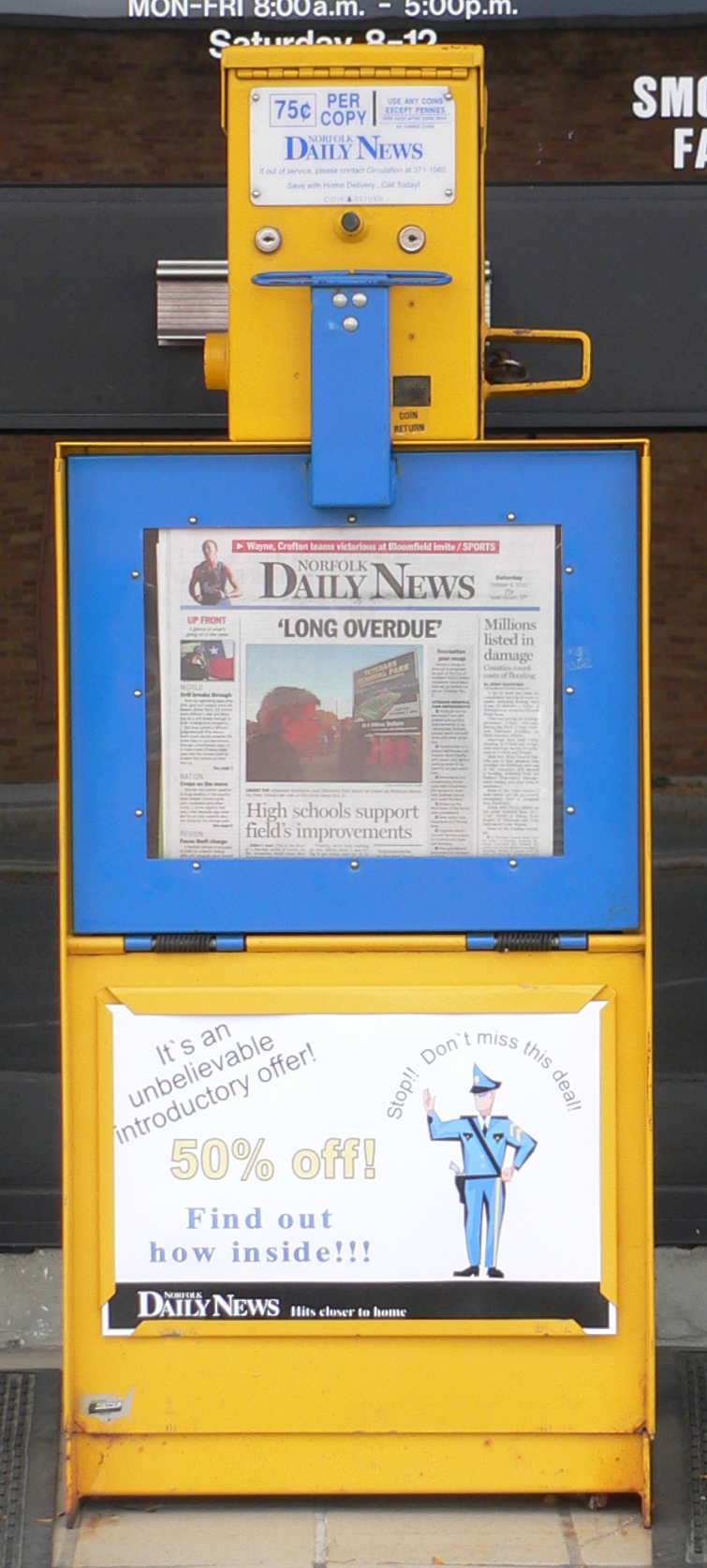
- Vending machine outside Norfolk Daily News building
- Type: Daily
- Format: Broadsheet
- Owner: Huse Publishing
- Publisher: Jerry Huse
- Editor: Tim Pearson, Austin Svehla
- Founded: May 1, 1887
- Headquarters: Norfolk, Nebraska
- Circulation: 12,050
- Website: norfolkdailynews.com

The Norfolk Daily News is a daily newspaper located in Norfolk, Nebraska. It was founded in 1877 and purchased by the Huse family is 1888, and Huse Publishing has maintained ownership of the paper since. In addition to expanding the circulation of the Norfolk Daily News, started the Huse family has started three radio stations in the area.

== History ==
The Norfolk Daily News is a daily newspaper located in downtown Norfolk, Nebraska. It is one of just a handful of daily newspapers in the country owned and managed by an individual family. The Huse family, including publisher Bill Huse, has owned and managed the Norfolk Daily News since 1888. Five generations of the Huse family have run the paper. The Norfolk Daily News began as a daily newspaper May 1, 1887, and was bought by the Huse family in 1888 when its circulation was 400.

=== Huse family ===
William Huse, who started the first newspaper in Northeast Nebraska at Ponca in 1871, purchased the Norfolk Daily News with his son, W.N. Huse. The latter moved to Norfolk to manage the paper. W.N. was publisher until his death in 1913. He was succeeded by his son, Gene, who was publisher until 1956 and president of Huse Publishing Company until his death in 1961. In addition to publishing the Daily, Huse Publishing also published other Norfolk papers such as the Norfolk Weekly News-Journal. Huse & Sons would also act as publishers for the Weekly News-Journal, with Gene Huse acting as managing editor, from 1888 to 1893. After acting as editor of the paper, Gene founded the radio station WJAG in Norfolk, which received its license in 1922.

Jerry Huse, Gene's son, became publisher of the Daily News in 1956 and president in 1961. He founded what is now Norfolk Printing Company in 1955, which was sold in 1973. He built WJAG's present home in 1956 and the present plant of the Daily News in 1963. The plant was converted to offset printing in 1972. A new addition to the plant was added in 1990. He started two more radio stations in Norfolk, KEXL in 1971 and KQKX in 2009.

Bill Huse, Jerry's son, became publisher of the Daily News in 2013. Jerry continues as president of Huse Publishing Company and the three radio stations.

== Other media ==
Radio statio WJAG was founded by the publisher of the Daily News. The station's original slogan was "The Voice of the Norfolk Daily News." The newspaper's city editor in 1922, Karl Stefan, anchored the station's first news report and served as chief announcer until his election to Congress in 1935. In addition to KEXL and KQKX, other media connected to the corporation include the Norfolk Area Shopper and Albion Shopper.
