= Norfolk Hotel =

Norfolk Hotel may refer to:

- Norfolk Hotel, Brighton, England
- Norfolk Hotel, Fremantle, Australia
- Norfolk Royale Hotel, England
- Fairmont The Norfolk Hotel, Nairobi, Kenya, for most of its existence known simply as the Norfolk Hotel
- Norfolk Hotel, Dedham, Massachusetts

== See also ==
- Hotel Norfolk, Norfolk, Nebraska
