= WJAG =

- Norfolk, Nebraska; United States
- Frequency: 780 kHz
- Branding: Newstalk WJAG 780 AM and 105.9 FM

Programming
- Format: Talk radio
- Network: Fox News Radio
- Affiliations: Compass Media Networks; Premiere Networks; Westwood One

Ownership
- Owner: WJAG, Inc.
- Sister stations: KEXL, KQKX

History
- First air date: September 13, 1922; 103 years ago

Technical information
- Licensing authority: FCC
- Facility ID: 73121
- Class: D
- Power: 1,000 watts (daytime only)
- ERP: 105.9 FM: 250 watts
- Transmitter coordinates: 42°1′54″N 97°29′47″W
- Translator: 105.9 K290AT (Norfolk)

Links
- Public license information: Public file; LMS
- Website: norfolkneradio.com

WJAG (780 AM, "Newstalk 780") is a commercial radio station broadcasting a talk radio format. It is licensed to Norfolk, Nebraska, and covers parts of Nebraska, Iowa and South Dakota. It was founded in 1922 by the Huse Publishing Company, publisher of the Norfolk Daily News, and since 1956 to a subsidiary, WJAG, Inc. The studios are at 525 Norfolk Avenue in the newspaper headquarters.

WJAG is a daytimer station, powered at 1,000 watts. AM 780 is a clear channel frequency reserved for Class A WBBM Chicago. So to avoid interference, WJAG's AM transmitter must go off the air at night. Programming is heard around the clock on 250-watt FM translator K290AT at 105.9 MHz.

== Programming ==
WJAG features syndicated talk radio shows from Premiere Networks, Westwood One and other producers. Most hours begin with world and national news from Fox News Radio. The CBS Sports Radio Network fills much of the overnight airtime.

In July 2008, WJAG became one of the first AM stations to operate a co-located FM translator. K290AT at 105.9 FM carries WJAG's programming 24 hours a day, including nighttime hours after the AM closes down.

== History ==
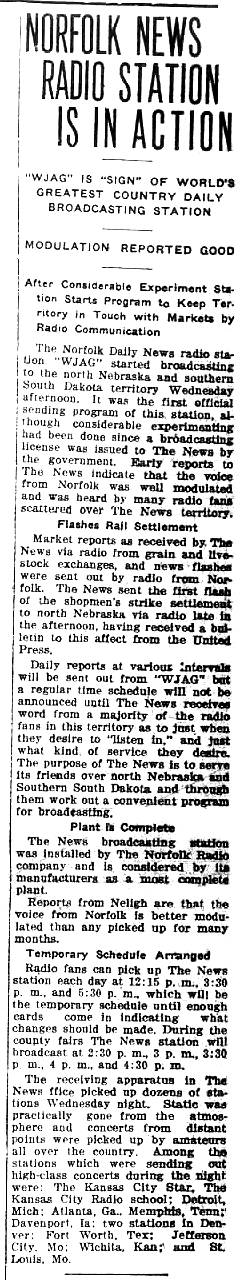
WJAG began regular service on the afternoon of September 13, 1922.

Information about WJAG's first two decades is somewhat limited, because many early station records were destroyed by a flood on May 12, 1944.

Gene Huse, publisher of the Norfolk Daily News, was the key person responsible for establishing WJAG and overseeing technical operations. Huse was described in a 1951 biography as "a mechanic at heart" who had been interested in radio communication since 1912. In 1921, he and Lloyd Delbridge formed the Norfolk Radio Company, which sold radio receivers for the recently developed innovation of radio broadcasting. Huse went on to obtain a Commercial Radio Operator license, which was the qualification needed to act as a radio station engineer.

Effective December 1, 1921, the Department of Commerce, which regulated radio at this time, adopted regulations setting aside two wavelengths for use by broadcasting stations: 360 meters (833 kHz) for "entertainment" programs, and 485 meters (619 kHz) for "market and weather" reports. WJAG's first license was issued on July 27, 1922, to "Norfolk Daily News (Huse Publishing Co.)", for operation on 360 meters. The WJAG call sign was randomly assigned from a sequential list of available call letters. Currently most stations west of the Mississippi River have call letters beginning with "K". However, WJAG was licensed before the government changed the dividing line between W and K call signs. Prior to the January 1923 establishment of the Mississippi River as the boundary, call letters beginning with "W" were generally assigned to stations east of an irregular line formed by the western state borders from North Dakota south to Texas, with calls beginning with "K" going only to stations in states west of that line.

Employing a transmitter built by Huse, WJAG begin regular service on September 13, 1922. Its initial schedule was announced to be three afternoon news and market reports at 12:15, 3:30 and 5:30 p.m., although this was termed a "temporary schedule until enough [listener] cards come in indicating what changes should be made". A short time later the station was authorized to also broadcast on the 485 meter "market and weather reports" wavelength. As of January 20, 1923, the station's daily schedule was reported to be "12:15 p.m—markets, current events and aerograms; 3:30 p.m.—markets, current events, aerograms; 5 p.m. continental code school; 5:30 p.m.—current events, features, aerograms". The station reverted to only broadcasting on 360 meters a few months later.

The newspaper's city editor, Karl Stefan, anchored the station's first news report and served as chief announcer until his election to Congress in 1935. Stefan had come to Norfolk in 1909 as an Associated Press telegrapher working for the News. He initially rewrote dispatches for the paper, and was eventually promoted to the city editor position. With the introduction of WJAG, Stefan was selected to prepare and broadcast a daily noon news program. Employing a shortwave transmitter, he originated "Voice of the Street" live broadcasts of local residents on December 19, 1932.

WJAG's first studio consisted of a single room in the Daily News building at the corner of 4th Street and Braasch Avenue in downtown Norfolk. Early programming consisted of performances by community choral groups, barbershop quartets and polka bands. The station's first remote broadcast was prompted by a performance by a 67-member choir. The choir was too large to fit in the one-room studio, and the station was able to obtain use of the automobile showroom at the neighboring Buick dealer. A wire was run across the street to carry audio of the choir's performance from the dealership to the studio. WJAG was commercial-free until February 1926, when mounting expenses created the need to sell airtime to cover costs. The first advertiser was the Carberry Seed Company, and eight others followed the next year, including Ryal-Miller Chevrolet, and Omaha agency Buchanan-Thomas.

In late 1923 the station moved to 1060 kHz, now with 250 watts, and two years later was reassigned to 1110 kHz. A mid-1927 reassignment to 1350 kHz by the newly formed Federal Radio Commission (FRC) was cancelled, and changed to 1050 kHz. On November 11, 1928, with the implementation of the FRC's General Order 40, WJAG moved to 1060 kHz. With this new assignment the station operated under a "limited time" authorization, with unrestricted daytime hours, but evening hours limited by no later than the time of sunset of the dominant stations on the frequency, which were originally WBAL in Baltimore, Maryland and WTIC in Hartford, Connecticut, with WTIC later replaced by KTHS in Hot Springs, Arkansas. In March 1941, with the implementation of the North American Regional Broadcasting Agreement, the stations on 1060 kHz, including WJAG, moved to 1090 kHz.

In 1926, station operations moved to the newly constructed Hotel Norfolk, with the station's two antenna towers constructed on the rooftop. In addition to offices later moved to the ground floor, a glass enclosed studio allowed hotel patrons to view ongoing broadcasts.

Beginning in the early hours of May 12, 1944, the North Fork of the Elkhorn River experienced one of its worst floods. WJAG offices and studios in the Hotel Norfolk became inaccessible, so station staff and announcers gathered at the transmitter site to make emergency broadcasts. A review by NAB Reports stated that: "The flooding of the telephone building put all phones in Norfolk out of order and the telegraph office was isolated. Radio Station WJAG was the only means of getting information and instructions to the people from the Red Cross, American Legion, city and state officials. Appeals were made over WJAG to listeners in Omaha to notify KOWH and two-way communication was established. This was maintained for two days and was the only means of outside communication. Most of the station's records were destroyed, all the furniture was ruined but the typewriters and steel filing cabinets were salvaged. Hundreds of warnings, appeals, and reports were made. Any person interested in getting a digest of these may obtain them from the station. This is another story of outstanding service which a local radio station has made to the community." After the flood, studios and offices moved to the former Elkhorn Insurance Company building at Sixth Street and Norfolk Avenue.

In the early 1940s, the CBS corporation developed a complicated proposal to upgrade the facilities of KFAB, then in Lincoln, Nebraska. The plan included moving KFAB to Omaha, and changing its frequency from 780 to 1110 kHz. WJAG was concerned that this would cause interference to its signal on 1090 kHz, so CBS included paying the cost of moving WJAG to KFAB's former frequency of 780 kHz, which took place in 1944. The station later reported that one benefit of the move was that the "WJAG coverage area was nearly doubled".

In 1955, the WJAG studios moved into a new facility at 309 Braasch Avenue, adjacent to the site of its original broadcasts from the News building in 1922. Described as "ultra-modern quarters", the air-conditioned building was said to be "complete with the most modern broadcasting facilities". As a precaution against minor flooding, the structure was built "slightly above ground level". An "open house" on December 14, 1955, attracted an estimated 5,000 visitors.
