= John Nelson Goulty =

English Nonconformist Christian pastor

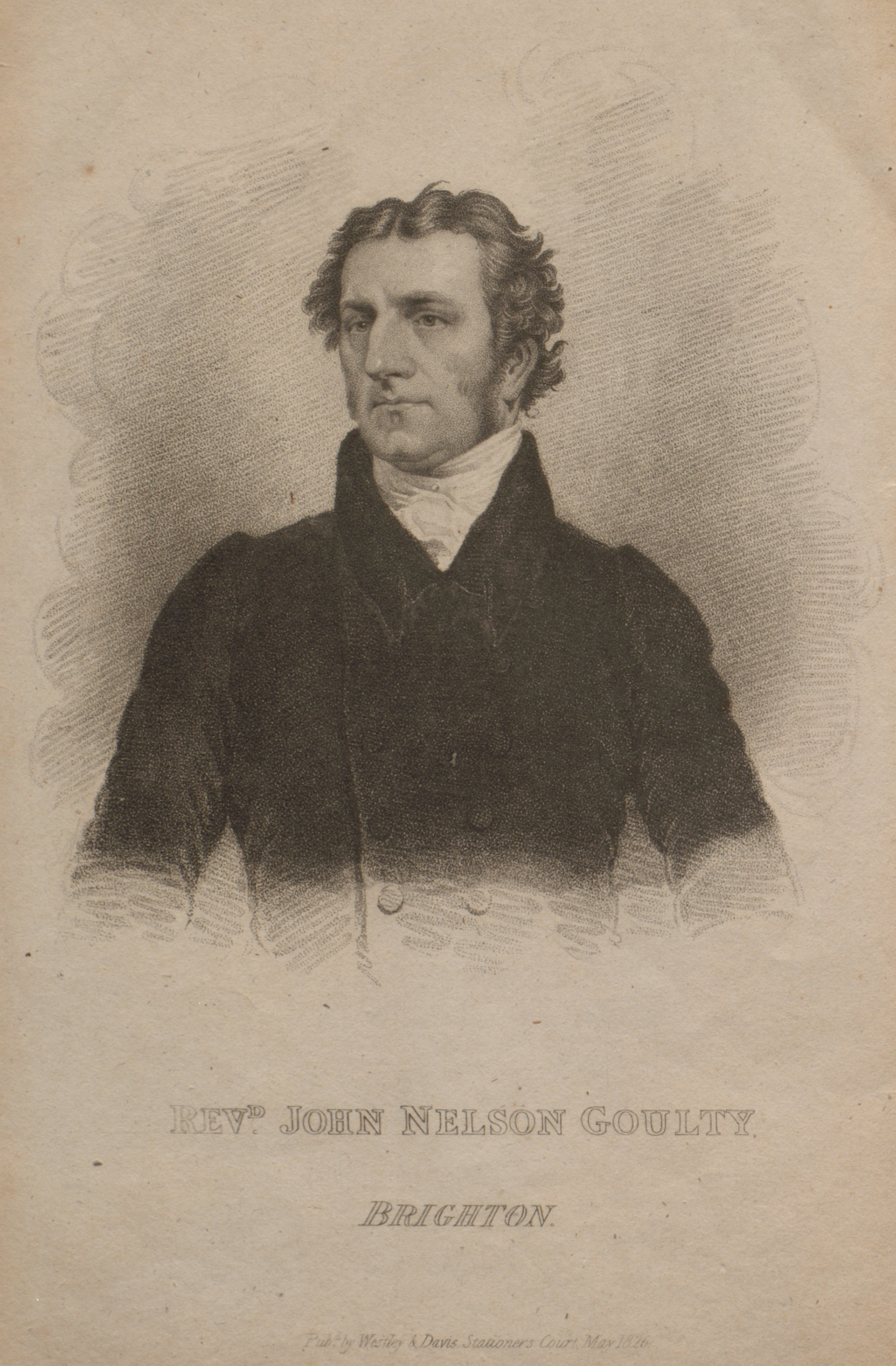
- Engraving published May 1826
- Born: 21 June 1788; East Dereham, Norfolk
- Died: 18 January 1870 (aged 81); Brighton, East Sussex
- Resting place: Extra Mural Cemetery, Brighton
- Occupation: Pastor
- Children: Horatio Nelson Goulty

John Nelson Goulty (21 June 1788 – 18 January 1870) was an English Nonconformist Christian pastor. He is best known for his sermons against mandatory tithing to the Church of England and against colonial slavery. After early work at Nonconformist chapels in Godalming and Henley-on-Thames, he moved to Brighton where he became "one of the most important persons" in the 300-year history of the town's Union Chapel. He also helped to found schools and a cemetery in Brighton.

== Biography ==
=== Early life ===
Goulty was born on 21 June 1788 in East Dereham, Norfolk. He was a cousin of Horatio Nelson, 1st Viscount Nelson (1758–1805). He was educated at Homerton College, a constituent college of the University of Cambridge, where he was taught by John Pye-Smith (1774–1851).

=== Career ===
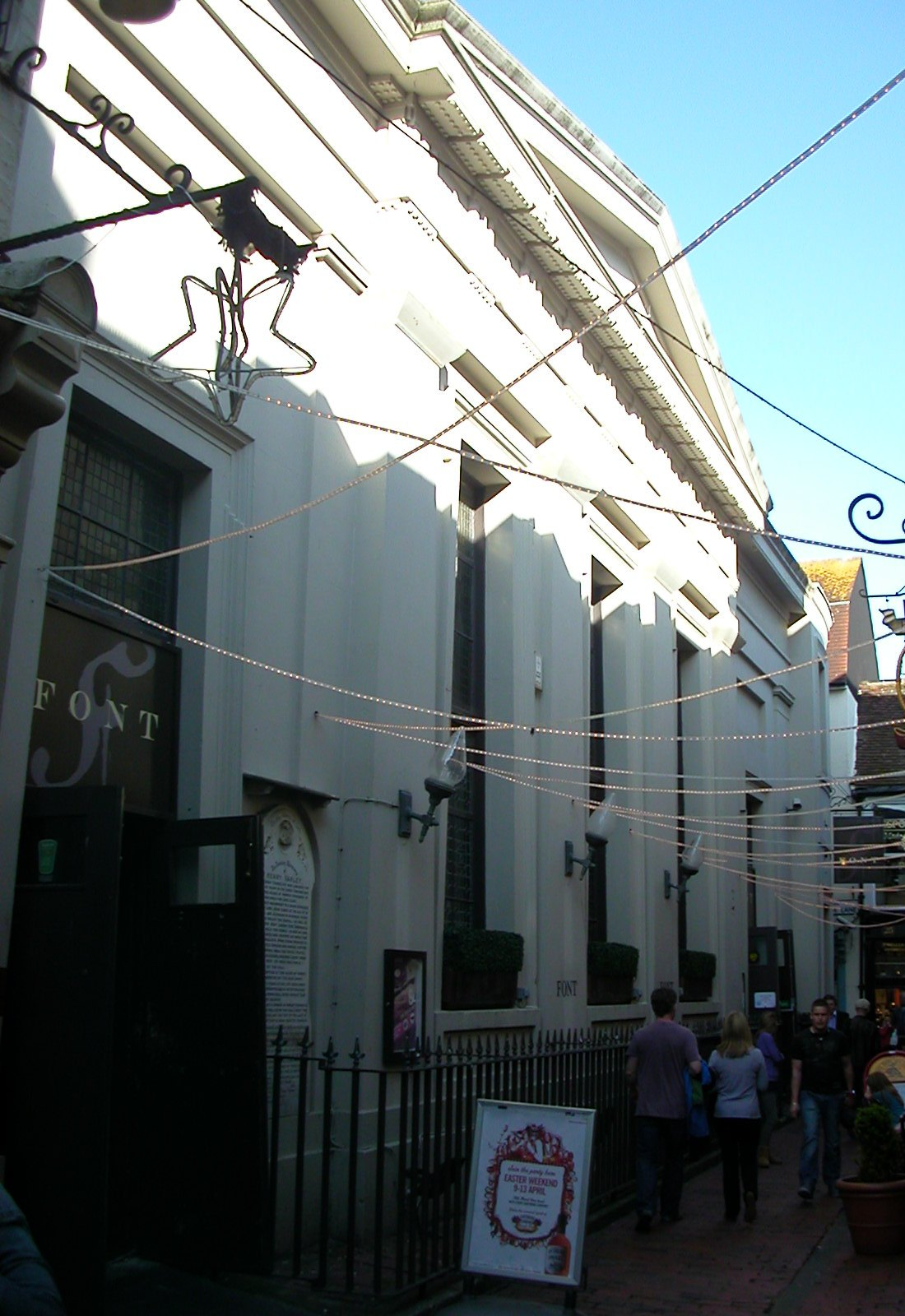
Goulty was pastor of Union Chapel, Brighton between 1823 and 1861.

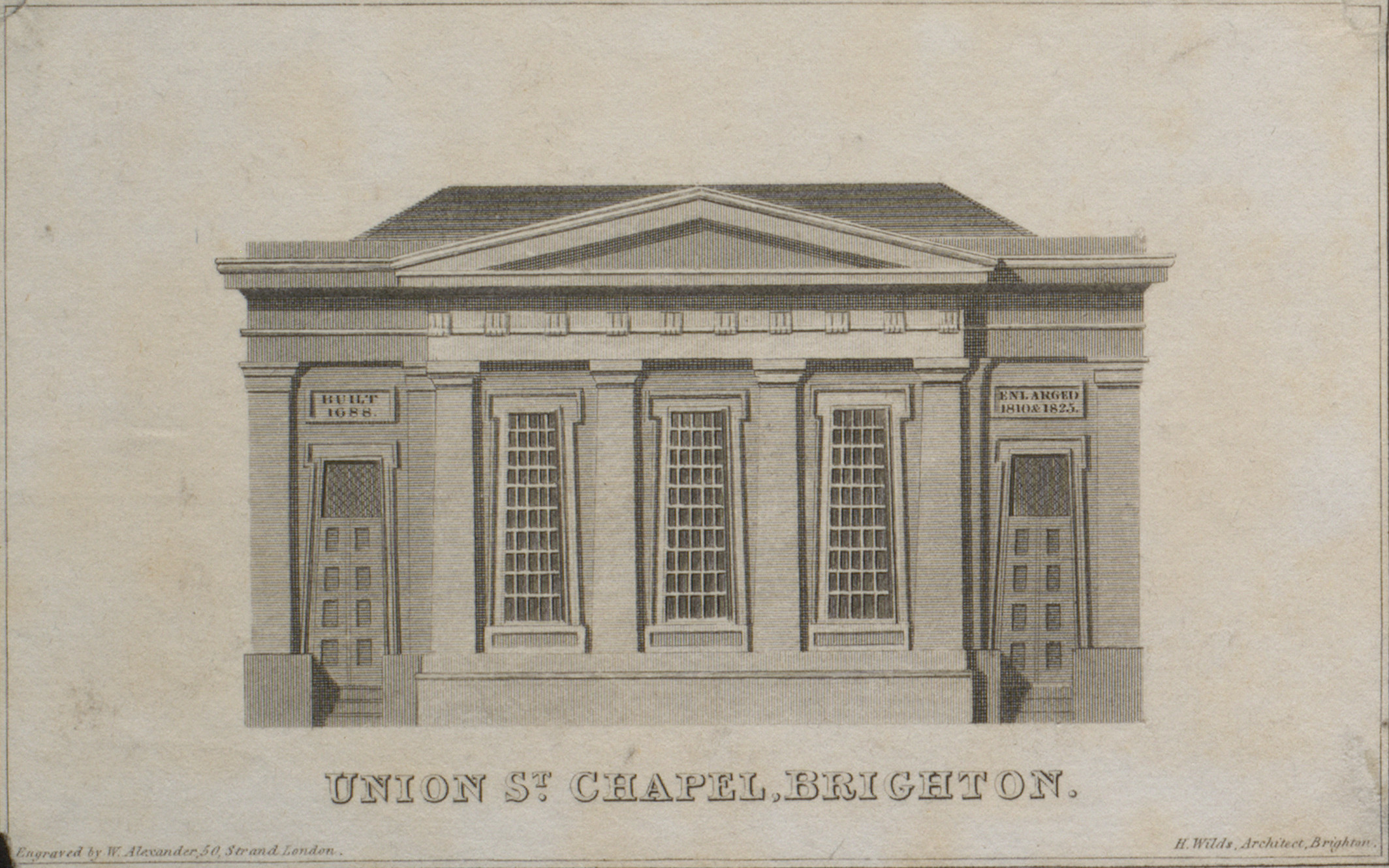
Union Chapel, Brighton, post-1823 arrangement as it would have appeared at Goulty's tenure, with the design attributed to "H. Wilds, Architect"

After Cambridge, he ministered in Godalming, Surrey from 1812 to 1815. This Surrey town had a long history of Nonconformist worship: a Presbyterian meeting was licensed in a private house in 1672, and in 1729 a permanent meeting house was built. After its pastor died in 1799, the cause declined and was taken on by the Surrey Congregational Mission and later by Independent Nonconformist students of Homerton College. Goulty was not an ordained pastor at this stage, but his service at the church saw it "considerably revived" from its declining state. He also travelled to the nearby villages of Elstead and Hascombe to preach. In 1815, he was ordained as pastor at the Independent chapel in Henley-on-Thames, where he served for nine years.

From 1823 to 1862, he served as the pastor of Union Chapel in Brighton, East Sussex, succeeding John Styles. The chapel had been enlarged during Styles's 15-year incumbency, and immediately grew in popularity when Goulty took over. Its earlier debts of £1,000 were settled, and in 1825 the chapel was redesigned in Classical style with Greek Revival and Egyptian Revival elements. The exterior was designed on a "grand scale", as was its interior: below a domed ceiling ran a deep balcony supported on ornate iron columns. The architect has been the subject of much disagreement: Amon Wilds is usually credited, but Charles Busby produced and signed an architectural design in 1825 and the men probably worked together on it.

Goulty "soon became a prominent man in Brighton". He campaigned for Nonconformism and held many theological debates with the Vicar of Brighton Rev. Henry Michell Wagner and his son Rev. Arthur Wagner, curate of St Paul's Church and founder of others such as the Church of the Annunciation. One of their ongoing disagreements was over the mandatory tithing of nonconformists to the Church of England: nonconformists disagreed with the principle of paying tithes to a church they did not belong to. Goulty served as Secretary of the Royal Sussex County Hospital for two years between 1830 and 1832.

His particular interest was improving education in the town: he founded, and served 31 years (1835–1866) as Secretary of the Board of Governors to, the Brighton Union Charity School in Middle Street (now the Middle Street Primary School) in Brighton; and in 1828 together with John Russell, 1st Earl Russell (1792–1878) he founded and served as honorary secretary of the Royal British School on Eastern Road. In 1847, at the bottom of West Street on the seafront, he founded a school for the children of fishermen and an Independent preaching station called the Bethel Arch, at which he ministered to the fishermen themselves. The 1851 religious census confirmed that the chapel was "also used as a Day School" and had a capacity of 250 seats and standing room for an additional 50 worshippers. Goulty, who signed the census return, recorded 280 attendees at afternoon and evening services, and wrote that "the place is generally full ... [there are] many stragglers at the Door on the Beach". In the same census, Goulty recorded the capacity of Union Chapel as 900 seats and standing room for 100 more, and the morning and evening attendance as 574 and 300 respectively. A third Independent chapel associated with Goulty was the Hove Chapel in the neighbouring town of Hove. Founded in 1824 and with a capacity of 100, it was served by "local preachers" but was registered in Goulty's name. Attendance on census evening was 80. The chapel does not survive and its location is not known, although it may have been associated with a Presbyterian meeting house registered in 1779 "in or near Hove Street". Goulty was also instrumental in establishing the Henfield Congregational Church in 1832 with the financial assistance of Union Chapel, Brighton. The church was re-named "Henfield Evangelical Free Church" in 1961 and remains an active congregation situated in the original building on High Street, Henfield.

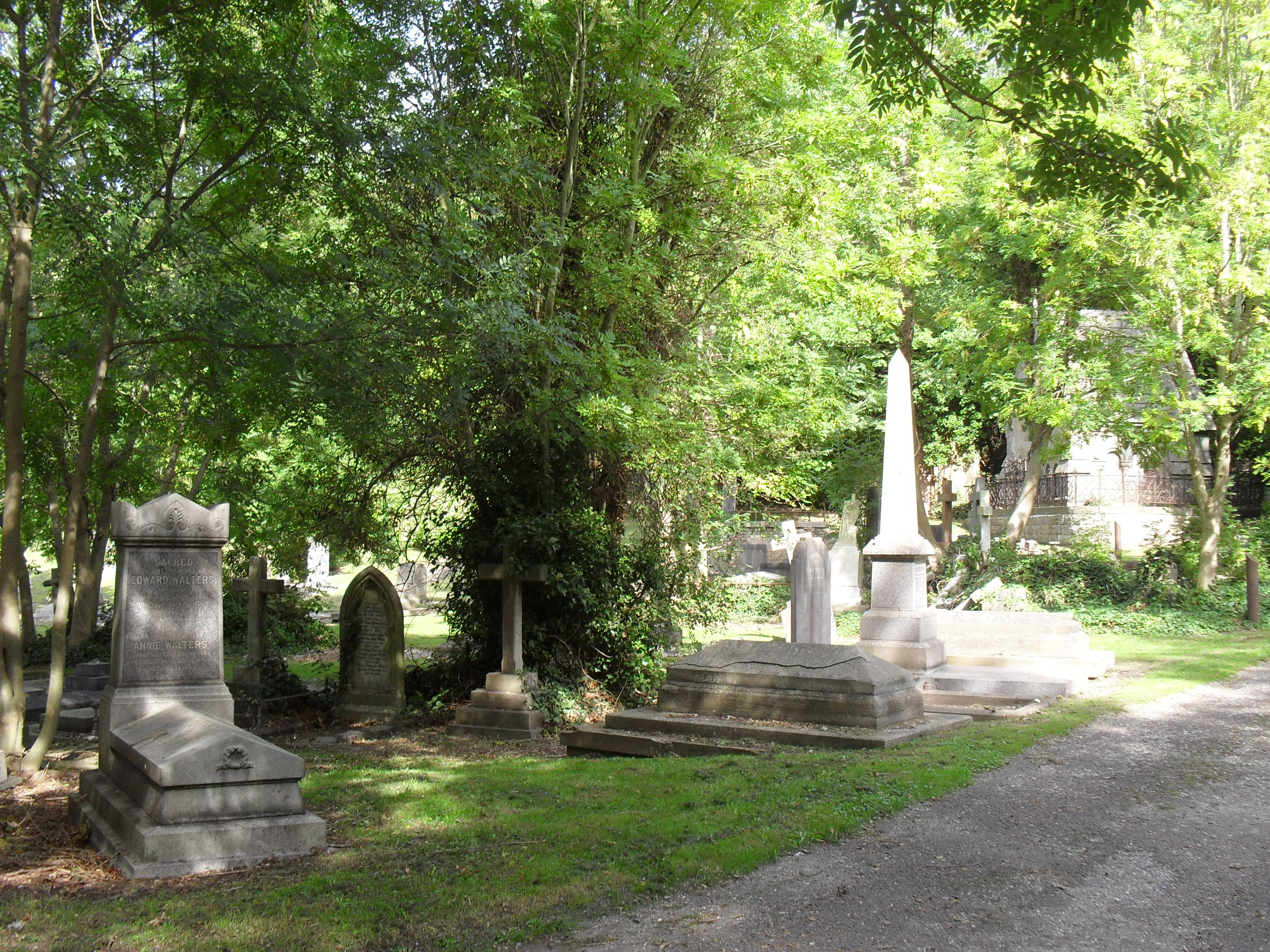
Goulty was one of the founders of the Extra Mural Cemetery, described as "one of the most delightful spots in the whole of Brighton".

Goulty also one of the four founders of the Extra Mural Cemetery in Brighton. In 1850, in response to a Government health inspector's critical report about sanitary conditions and public health in Brighton—which recommended that burials in churchyards and chapel burial grounds should cease—the doctor and political John Cordy Burrows, architect Amon Henry Wilds, Goulty and his son Horatio Nelson Goulty established the Brighton Extra Mural Company, acquired 13 acres (5.3 ha) of land near Race Hill, and laid out a private cemetery for Anglican, Roman Catholic and Nonconformist burials.

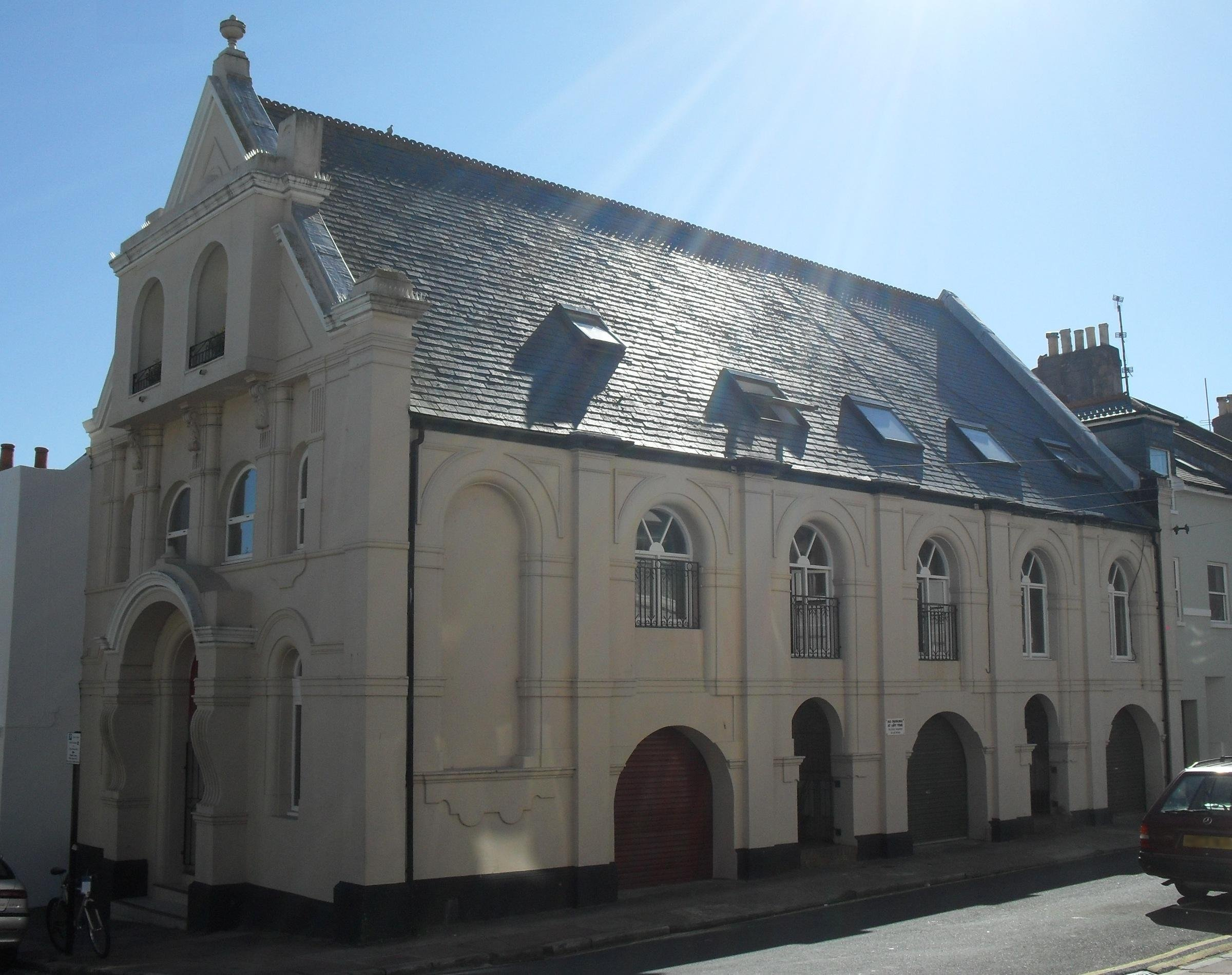
Goulty founded Sudeley Place Congregational Chapel in 1868.

Goulty's pastorate at Union Chapel ended in 1861 with his retirement, although in 1868 he founded a Congregational chapel at Sudeley Place in the Kemptown area of Brighton. (This closed in 1918 and was converted into a cinema by John Leopold Denman and later into a residential building.) He died in Brighton on 18 January 1870 and was buried at the Extra Mural Cemetery. His grave is in the unconsecrated southwest section of the cemetery and is marked by an obelisk-style memorial. His son Horatio Nelson Goulty, who predeceased him, was also active in public life in Brighton, principally as an architect but also as a supporter of hospitals and schools.

=== Personal life ===
He married twice. His first marriage was to Clementine Sharp. They had three children:

- William Nelson Goulty (31 October 1819–unknown).
- Clementina Sharp Goulty (29 October 1820–unknown).
- Mary Walter Goulty (12 May 1822–unknown).

His second marriage was to Elizabeth Fletcher. They had five children:

- Edmund Nelson Goulty (1827–unknown), christened 8 April 1827
- John Russell Goulty (1829–unknown), christened 18 January 1829
- Horatio Nelson Goulty (1830–1869; prominent architect in Brighton), christened 27 July 1830
- Elizabeth Fletcher Goulty (1832–unknown), christened 27 July 1830.
- Wallis Rivers Goulty (27 June 1834 – 31 December 1904), christened 31 August 2014

=== Legacy ===
A Scania OmniDekka bus of the Brighton & Hove Bus Company, number 664, is named in his honour.

== Works ==
Publications by Goulty include:

- — (1826). A Discourse on Colonial Slavery (delivered 5 February 1826). London: Richard Clay. pp. 1‒47.
- — (1830). A Memoir of a Beloved Son. pp. 1‒16.
