= George Wade Robinson =

Irish poet (1838–1876)

George Wade Robinson (10 September 1838 – 23 January 1876) was a poet and hymnist from Cork, Ireland.

== Biography ==
Robinson was educated at Trinity College, Dublin, and New College, St. John's Wood, London. He entered the congregational ministry and was co-pastor at York Street Chapel in Dublin with William Urwick the elder. He then became pastor at St. John's Wood, Dudley, and at Union Chapel, Union Street, Brighton. His best remembered poetry is in the hymn Loved with Everlasting Love with its chorus I am His and he His mine.

He died in Southampton on 23 January 1876.

== Writings ==
- Loveland and other poems 1871 ASIN: B0017UX9LO
- Lays Of A Heart (1867) Kessinger Publishing Co (1 Oct 2008) ISBN 978-1-4370-6308-0
- The philosophy of the atonement & other sermons (Everyman's library, ed. by Ernest Rhys. E.P. Dutton (1912) ASIN: B0008638BY
- Iona, and other sonnets, etc ASIN: B0017UVJ48
