= Horatio Nelson Goulty =

English architect

- Born: 1832 or 1833; Brighton, East Sussex, England
- Died: 7 July 1869; Shoreham-by-Sea, West Sussex, England
- Occupation: Architect
- Parent: John Nelson Goulty

Horatio Nelson Goulty (1832/33 – 7 July 1869) was an English architect. He designed several buildings in Brighton and was an important figure in the town's public affairs in the early Victorian era.

== Biography ==
=== Early life ===
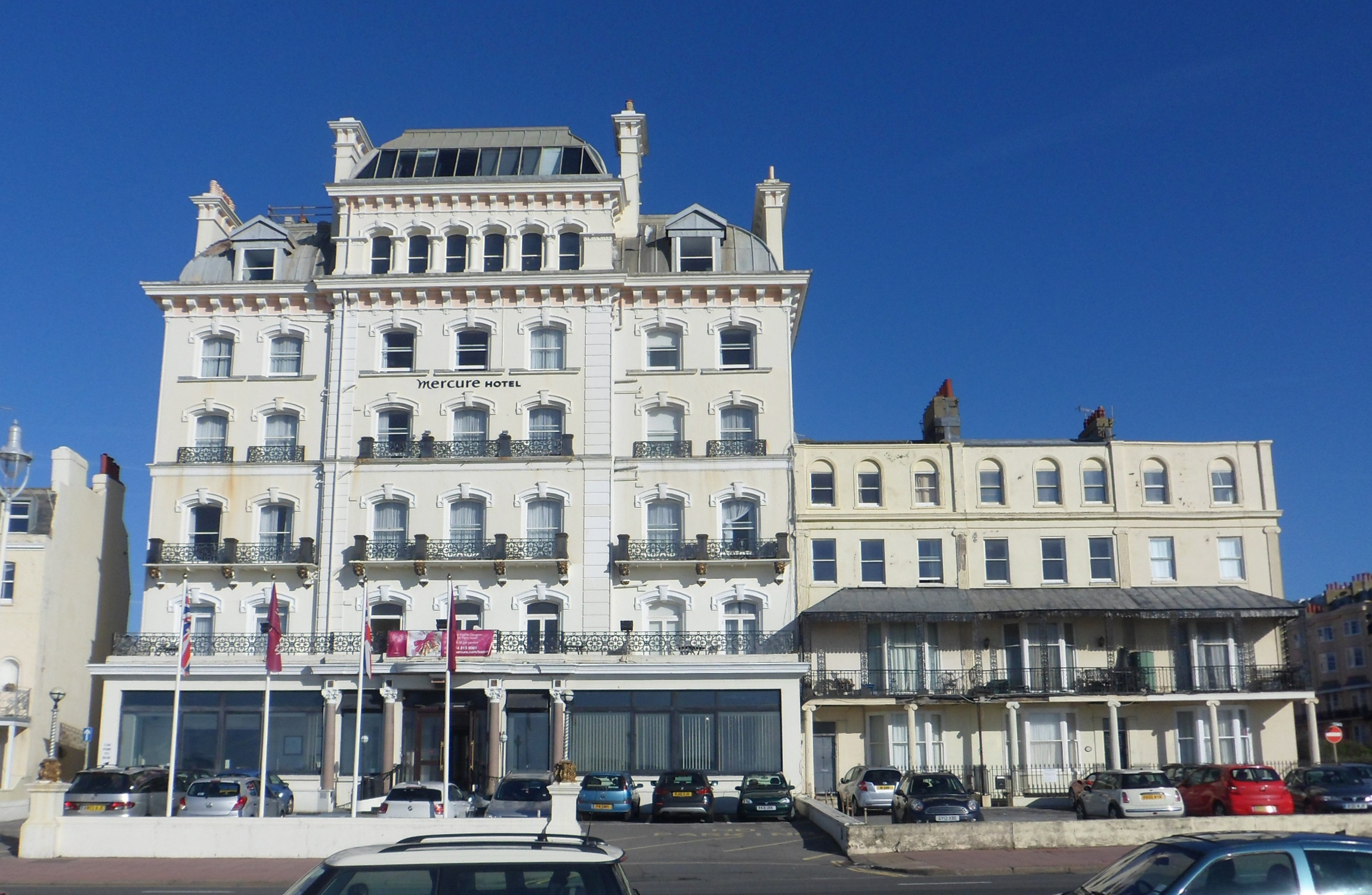
The Norfolk Hotel

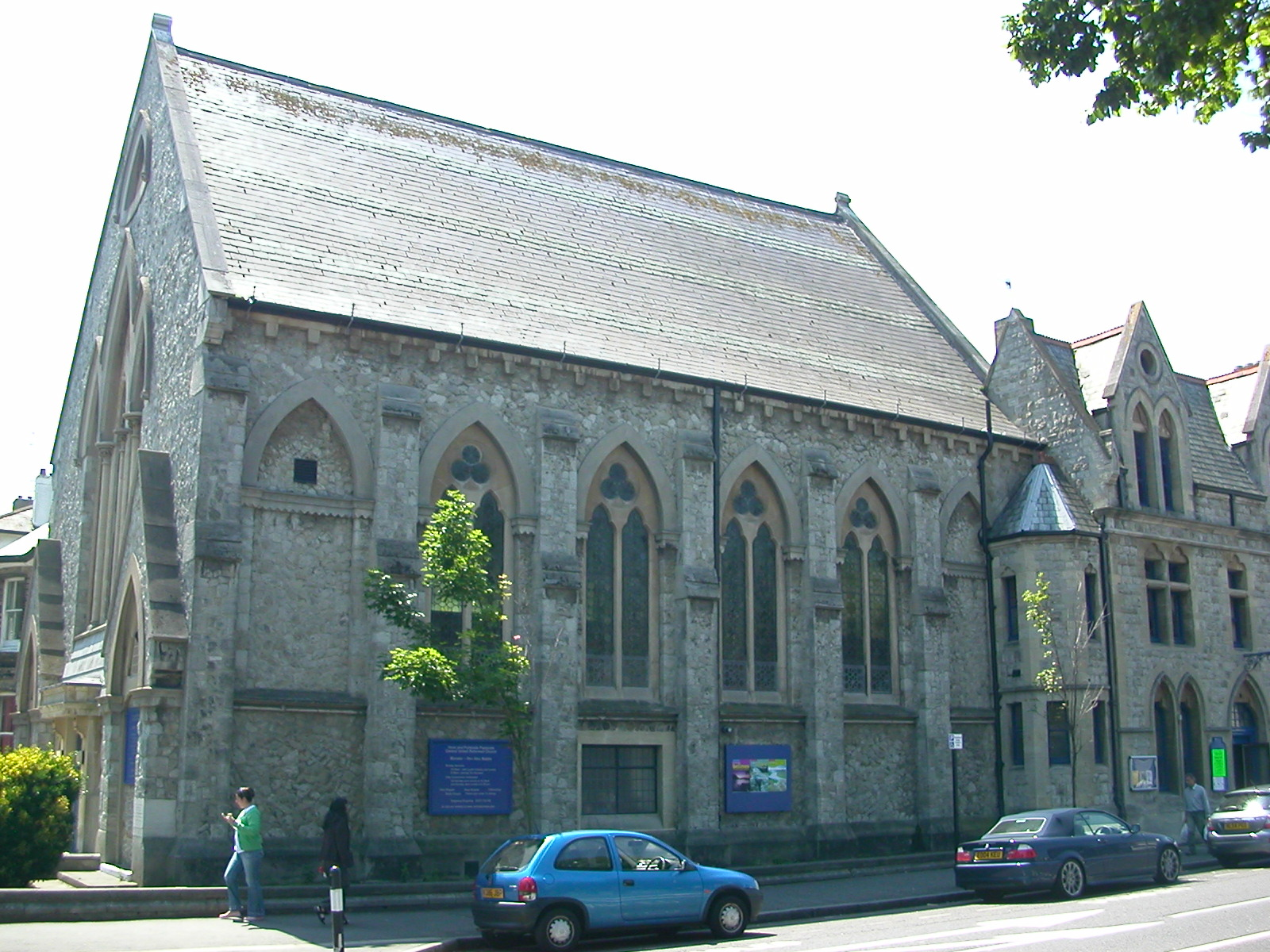
Central United Reformed Church, Hove

Horatio Nelson Goulty was born in 1832 or 1833 (Note: He was 36 years old at the time of his death in July 1869.) in Brighton, East Sussex. His father was Reverend John Nelson Goulty, the pastor of Union Chapel and a cousin of Horatio Nelson, 1st Viscount Nelson (1758–1805). Goulty was married and had two children.

=== Career ===
In 1850, Goulty and his father were two of the four founders of the Extra Mural Cemetery in Brighton. The others were architect Amon Henry Wilds and doctor and politician John Cordy Burrows. Although Wilds has been credited in some sources with the design of the two cemetery chapels (only one of which survives), Goulty's obituary in the Freemasons' Magazine and Masonic Mirror attributes the buildings to him. Goulty's influence in Brighton's public life increased when he became councillor for Park ward, one of six wards created in 1854 to govern the newly created Municipal Borough of Brighton. Named after Queen's Park, this electoral division covered the east of the town. He supported the town's Children's Hospital, which was founded by local doctor R.P.B. Taaffe at 178 Western Road on 3 August 1868 with the name Brighton Hospital for Sick Children. It now occupies a different site and is known as the Royal Alexandra Hospital. He also served as a secretary of the Local School of Art in Brighton, a Sunday Schools inspector and a deacon at a Nonconformist chapel.

Goulty was responsible for two new Congregational churches in East Sussex during the 1860s. Cliftonville Congregational Church, a congregation based in central Hove, used his Sunday School building (erected in 1861) for worship until his grey stone Early English Gothic Revival-style church building was finished. The church is still in active use under the name Central United Reformed Church. In 1866, he used a different architectural style—plain Neoclassical—for his design of the Newhaven Congregational Chapel at Newhaven, which replaced a building of 1797. The stucco-faced stone building served as a church until 1938, after which it fell into dereliction and later became an antiques market.

In 1864, he designed the Norfolk Hotel, located at 149 Kings Road in Brighton. The French Renaissance Revival-style building is Grade II-listed and remains in use as a luxury hotel. The author of Moorecroft's Guide (1866), a guidebook about the resort, called it "more beautiful than any other building in Brighton". He later designed the Grand Concert Hall which opened in 1866 on the southeast side of West Street, near the seafront, but was in use for only 16 years because it was destroyed by fire in 1882. He also reconstructed the Hanningtons department store on North Street, also in Brighton, and school buildings in Hurstpierpoint, and was commissioned by several early building societies for architectural and surveying work.

Between 1867 and 1868, he designed the Brighton Hammam, a Victorian Turkish bath, for the newly formed Brighton Turkish Baths Company Ltd. In addition to Goulty, the Company Secretary and all six of the original directors were Freemasons. The Hammam, built by Goulty and Gibbins, was located at 57–59 West Street and cost £14,000. One commentator described the exterior as "rising like some Moorish temple, resplendent with crimson and gilt". After closure in 1910, the building was converted into the Academy Cinema and was demolished in 1973.

He became a Freemason in December 1863. He was also a member of the Order of the Knights Templar.

=== Death ===
He died on 7 July 1869 in Shoreham-by-Sea, West Sussex, England. His funeral was held 12 days later at the Extra Mural Cemetery, where between 800 and 1,000 mourners were in attendance.

== Bibliography ==
- Antram, Nicholas; Morrice, Richard (2008). Brighton and Hove. Pevsner Architectural Guides. London: Yale University Press. ISBN 978-0-300-12661-7.
- Carder, Timothy (1990). The Encyclopaedia of Brighton. Lewes: East Sussex County Libraries. ISBN 0-86147-315-9.
- Collis, Rose (2010). The New Encyclopaedia of Brighton. (based on the original by Tim Carder) (1st ed.). Brighton: Brighton & Hove Libraries. ISBN 978-0-9564664-0-2.
- Dale, Antony (1950). The History and Architecture of Brighton. Brighton: Bredin & Heginbothom Ltd.
- Dale, Antony (1991). Brighton Cemeteries. Brighton: Brighton Borough Council.
- Elleray, D. Robert (2004). Sussex Places of Worship. Worthing: Optimus Books. ISBN 0-9533132-7-1.
- Middleton, Judy (2002). The Encyclopaedia of Hove & Portslade. Brighton: Brighton & Hove Libraries.
- Shifrin, Malcolm (2015). Victorian Turkish Baths. Swindon: Historic England. ISBN 978-1-84802-230-0.
