= KEXL =

- Pierce, Nebraska; United States
- Broadcast area: Norfolk, Nebraska
- Frequency: 97.5 MHz
- Branding: Lite Rock 97.5

Programming
- Format: Adult contemporary
- Affiliations: Compass Media Networks

Ownership
- Owner: WJAG, Inc.
- Sister stations: WJAG, KQKX

History
- First air date: 2009

Technical information
- Licensing authority: FCC
- Facility ID: 170494
- Class: C3
- ERP: 50,000 watts
- HAAT: 141.2 meters (463 ft)
- Transmitter coordinates: 42°19′17″N 97°25′40″W

Links
- Public license information: Public file; LMS
- Webcast: Listen Live
- Website: literock97.com

KEXL (97.5 FM) is a radio station broadcasting an adult contemporary format. Licensed to Pierce, Nebraska, United States, the station is currently owned by WJAG, Inc. and features programming from Compass Media Networks.

The station, which was launched in 2009, takes its call letters and format from another station owned by the same company, which is now known as KQKX and has a country music format.
