= KQKX =

- Norfolk, Nebraska; United States
- Frequency: 106.7 MHz
- Branding: 106 Kix Country

Programming
- Format: Country

Ownership
- Owner: WJAG, Inc.
- Sister stations: WJAG, KEXL

History
- Former call signs: WJAG-FM (1971–1979); KEXL (1979–2009)

Technical information
- Licensing authority: FCC
- Facility ID: 73122
- Class: C1
- ERP: 100,000 watts
- HAAT: 273.9 meters
- Transmitter coordinates: 41°55′59″N 97°40′49″W

Links
- Public license information: Public file; LMS
- Website: www.106kix.com

KQKX (106.7 FM) is a radio station broadcasting a country format. Licensed to Norfolk, Nebraska, the station transmits at 100,000 watts. KQKX has a large footprint, serving all of northeastern Nebraska, reaching south along the I-80 corridor, west towards Ord, Nebraska, and east along the Missouri River valley and north, into portions of southeast South Dakota.

The station is currently owned by WJAG, Inc.

== History ==
KQKX was first licensed, as WJAG-FM, in 1971. On September 10, 1979, the call letters were changed to KEXL, and the station aired a hot adult contemporary format known as "106.7 The X". On November 18, 2009, the call sign was changed to KQKX. The former call letters were transferred to a new KEXL in Pierce, Nebraska, on 97.5 FM.
