= Norfolk Hotel, Brighton =

Hotel in Brighton, England

Mercure Brighton Seafront Hotel
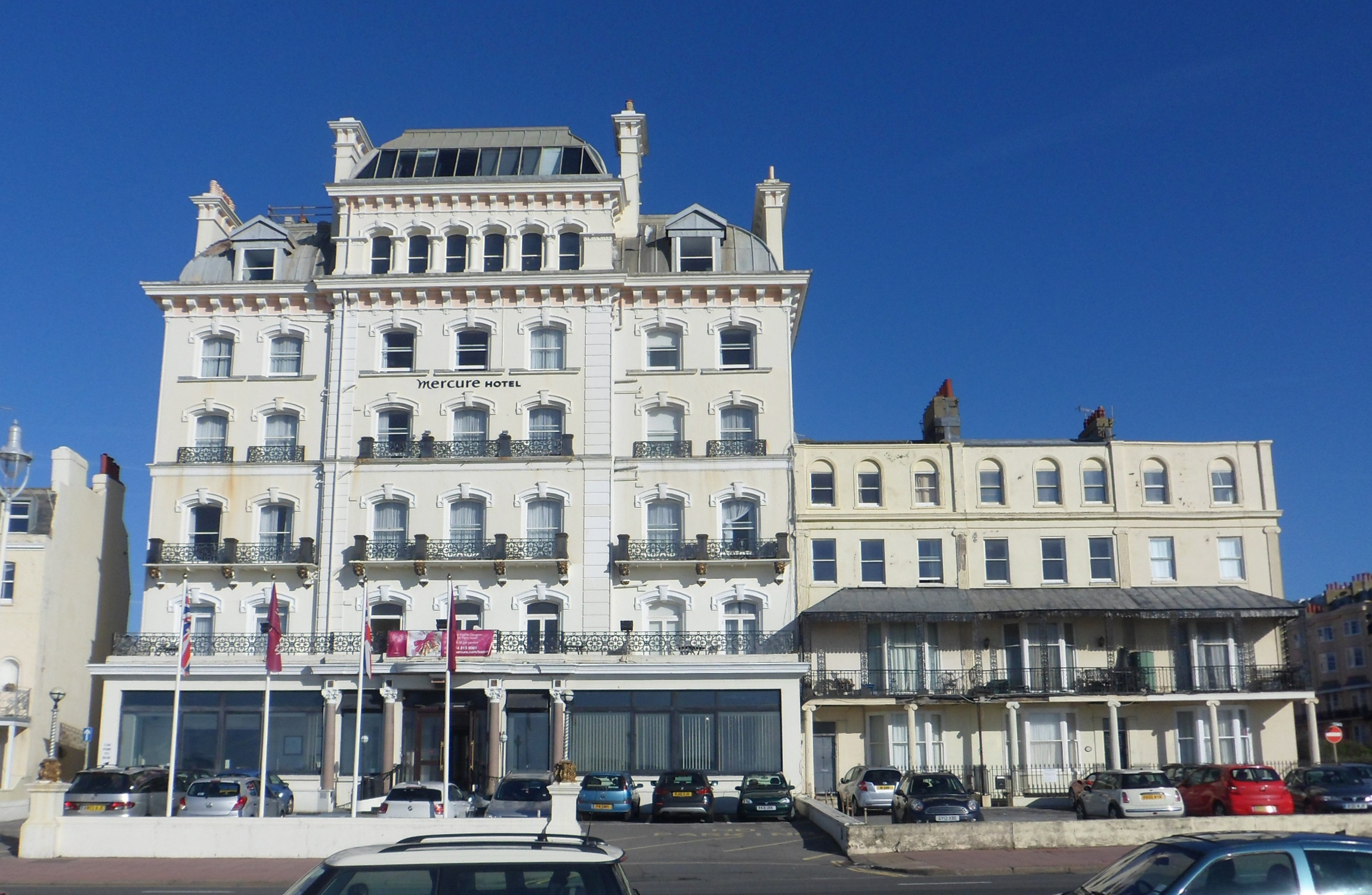
- The hotel from the south

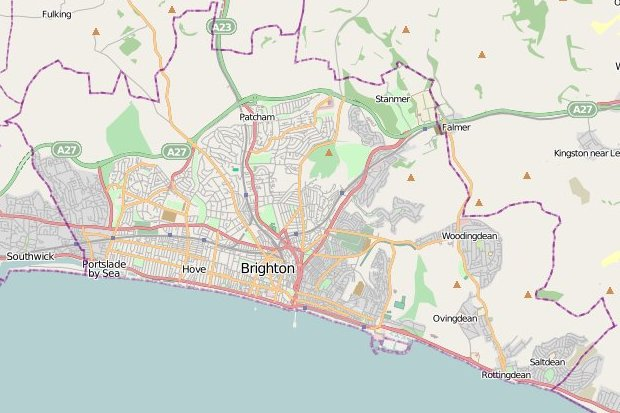
- Location within Brighton & Hove
- Former names: Norfolk Hotel
- Alternative names: Ramada Jarvis Hotel Brighton (previous branding)
- Hotel chain: Mercure Hotels

General information
- Status: Completed
- Type: Hotel
- Architectural style: French Renaissance Revival
- Location: 149 Kings Road, Brighton BN1 2PP, Brighton and Hove, United Kingdom
- Coordinates: 50.8228°N 0.1554°W
- Groundbreaking: 1864
- Construction started: 1864
- Completed: 1866
- Opened: 1866
- Owner: Accor S.A.

Height
- Architectural: French Renaissance Revival

Technical details
- Floor count: 6

Design and construction
- Architect: Horatio Nelson Goulty
- Designations: Grade II listed

Other information
- Number of suites: 117
- Number of restaurants: 1
- Number of bars: 1
- Parking: Yes

Website
- www.mercurebrighton.co.uk

The Norfolk Hotel (currently branded as the Mercure Brighton Seafront Hotel, and previously as the Ramada Jarvis Hotel Brighton and other names) is a 4-star hotel in the seaside resort of Brighton, part of the English city of Brighton and Hove. Designed in 1865 by architect Horatio Nelson Goulty, it replaced an earlier building called the Norfolk Inn and is one of several large Victorian hotels along the seafront. The French Renaissance Revival-style building, recalling E.M. Barry's major London hotels, is "tall, to make a show": the development of the passenger lift a few years earlier allowed larger hotels to be built. It is a Grade II listed building.

== History ==
West Street formed the western limit of development in Brighton until the end of the 18th century. At that time, the town was growing from a small fishing and agricultural settlement into a fashionable seaside resort. From 1800 on, seafront land that was formerly part of the West Laine (Note: In the Sussex dialect, a laine is a large area of open fields divided into smaller plots and narrow strips called furlongs and paul pieces respectively. Brighton was surrounded by five laines, and they shaped its development and street pattern.) was sold off in parcels to speculative builders. Some large-scale residential development took place, but it was only after 1820—when the road running parallel to the beach was widened and straightened to form a seafront promenade called Kings Road—that the area became easily accessible. The hotels, lodging houses and inns built along this stretch of road became the most popular and exclusive in the town at that time.

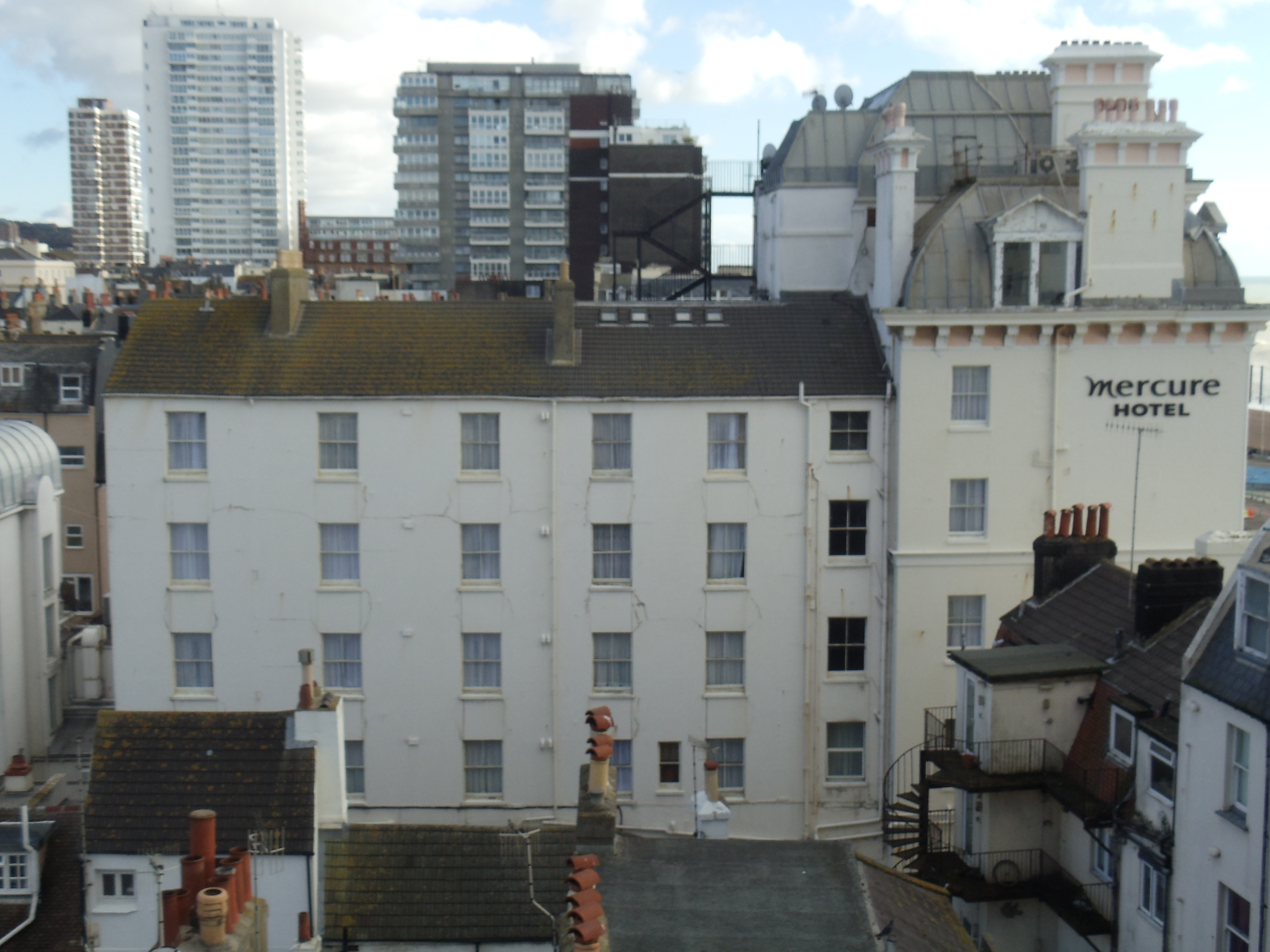
This view of the side elevation shows the elaborate mansard roofs, taken from Embassy Court.

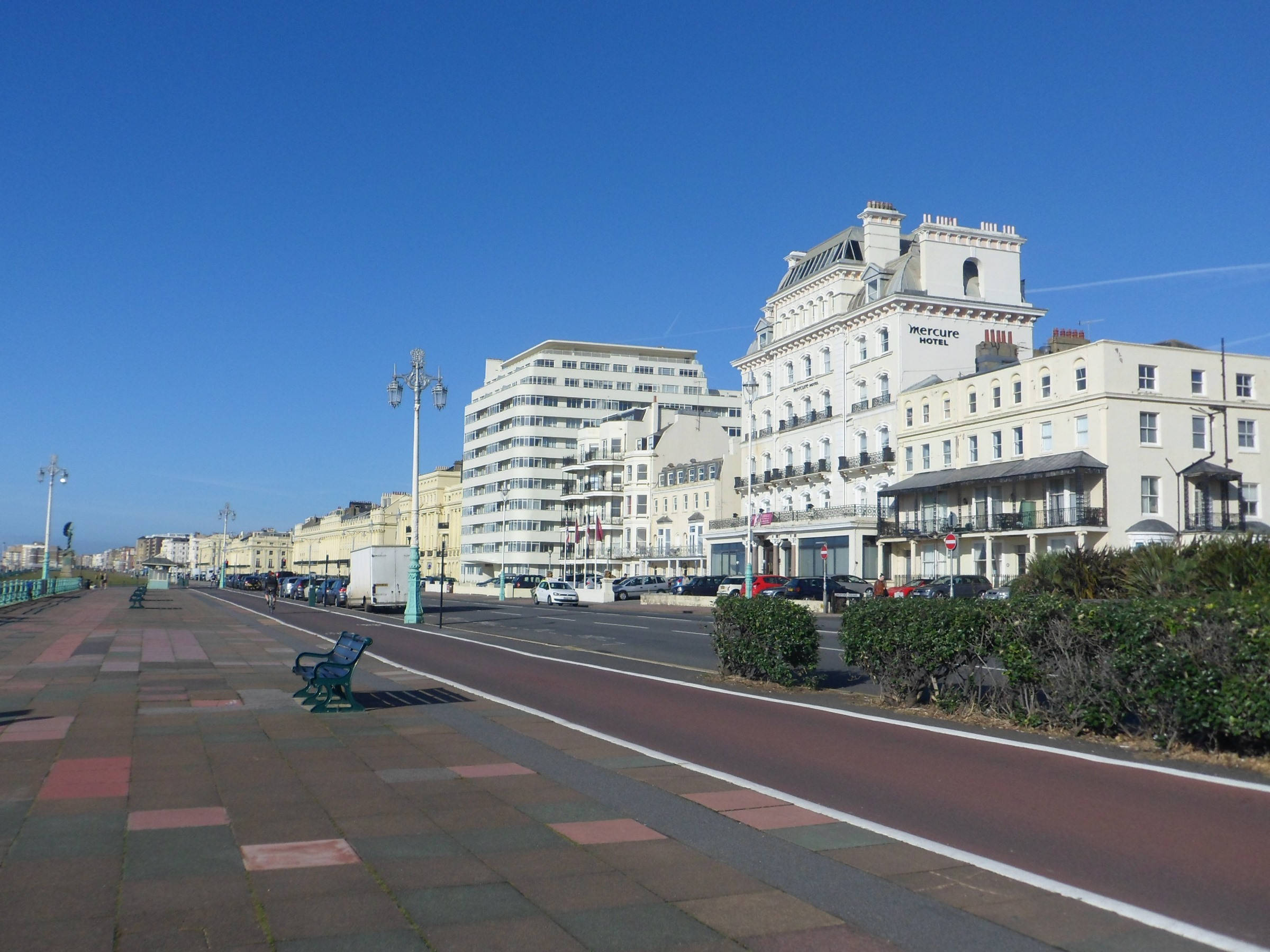
The hotel occupies a prominent position on Brighton seafront, near Embassy Court and the stuccoed terraces of Brunswick Town.

An inn and hotel called the Norfolk Arms was built west of Bedford Square in or before 1824—the year it was first listed in the Baxter's Directory of Brighton. (The square itself, the second such development in Brighton, was built in stages between 1801 and 1818.) Between 1828 and 1830, the inn became famous for its association with Edward Law, 1st Earl of Ellenborough and his wife Jane Digby, Lady Ellenborough; in 1830 there was a scandal when they divorced as a result of Lady Ellenborough's affair with Prince Felix of Schwarzenberg. Brighton!! A Comic Sketch, a poem written in that year, referred to the building satirically: "But ladies, use, when you next come / The Schwarzenberg Hotel". By 1841, though, its reputation was restored: a guidebook described it as "a capital family hotel, which has long enjoyed the patronage of many persons of rank and distinction". Architecturally, it had Classical overtones: Ionic columns supported a balcony and veranda across a four-storey central bay with three-storey flanking sections.

The 1860s was a time of innovation in hotel building and architecture. By the mid-19th century, staying in hotels had become much more popular than renting a large house for several months, which had been the norm for Brighton's wealthy visitors over the previous century. The Royal Albion and (original) Bedford Hotels of the 1820s were smaller-scale early examples, but only with the development of the passenger lift could they be built on a grand scale. One of Britain's first lifts—a water-powered "ascending omnibus", as it was called—was fitted in the newly built Grand Hotel on Kings Road in 1864. The following year, the Norfolk Arms was completely rebuilt, retaining nothing of its original form. Architect Horatio Nelson Goulty was commissioned for the job; an important figure in public life in Brighton, he was one of the founders of the Extra Mural Cemetery in 1850 and later in the 1860s designed Congregational churches in Newhaven and Hove. Goulty designed the building (now solely a hotel rather than an inn, and renamed the Norfolk Hotel accordingly) in a similar style to the Grand, albeit "slightly more florid". The author of Moorecroft's Guide (1866), a guidebook about the resort, called the rebuilt hotel "more beautiful than any other building in Brighton" despite offering mild criticism of the Grand's very similar architecture. As originally built, the Norfolk was much smaller than the Grand, with 64 bedrooms arranged over five floors compared to the latter's 150 bedrooms and eight storeys. Nevertheless, it was one of the major hotels of Victorian-era Brighton, which is "one of the few places in Britain where ... grand hotels of the European model can be seen". Along with the Grand and the nearby Metropole (1890), it was one of the "great show hotels on the front", at which only wealthy visitors would have stayed; the thousands of working-class holidaymakers would have used the poorer lodging-houses in less favourable locations.

In the early 1950s, the hotel was purchased and operated by industrialist, philanthropist and synagogue cantor, Isaac Gershon “IG” Woolf of Manchester. Mr Woolf also owned a hotel in the seaside resort of Bournemouth.

The building passed into the ownership of AVP Industries in the 20th century. The company sought permission to demolish it and replace it with flats in the 1960s, but after this was not granted it sold the hotel in 1969. Under the name Norfolk Resort Hotel, the building was listed at Grade II on 20 August 1971. Early in the 1980s, £2 million was spent on refurbishment, including the opening of an indoor swimming pool and the creation of a lake surrounded by additional rooms, both in 1985. A nightclub called Rafters also occupied the roof space at this time. The hotel was later taken on by the Ramada Jarvis chain. It still had that identity in 2010, but after the company went into liquidation the Accor hotel group acquired it in October 2011 as part of a deal to buy 24 former Ramada Jarvis hotels. These were rebranded under the Mercure name, and the Norfolk Hotel is now known as the Mercure Brighton Seafront Hotel.

== Architecture ==
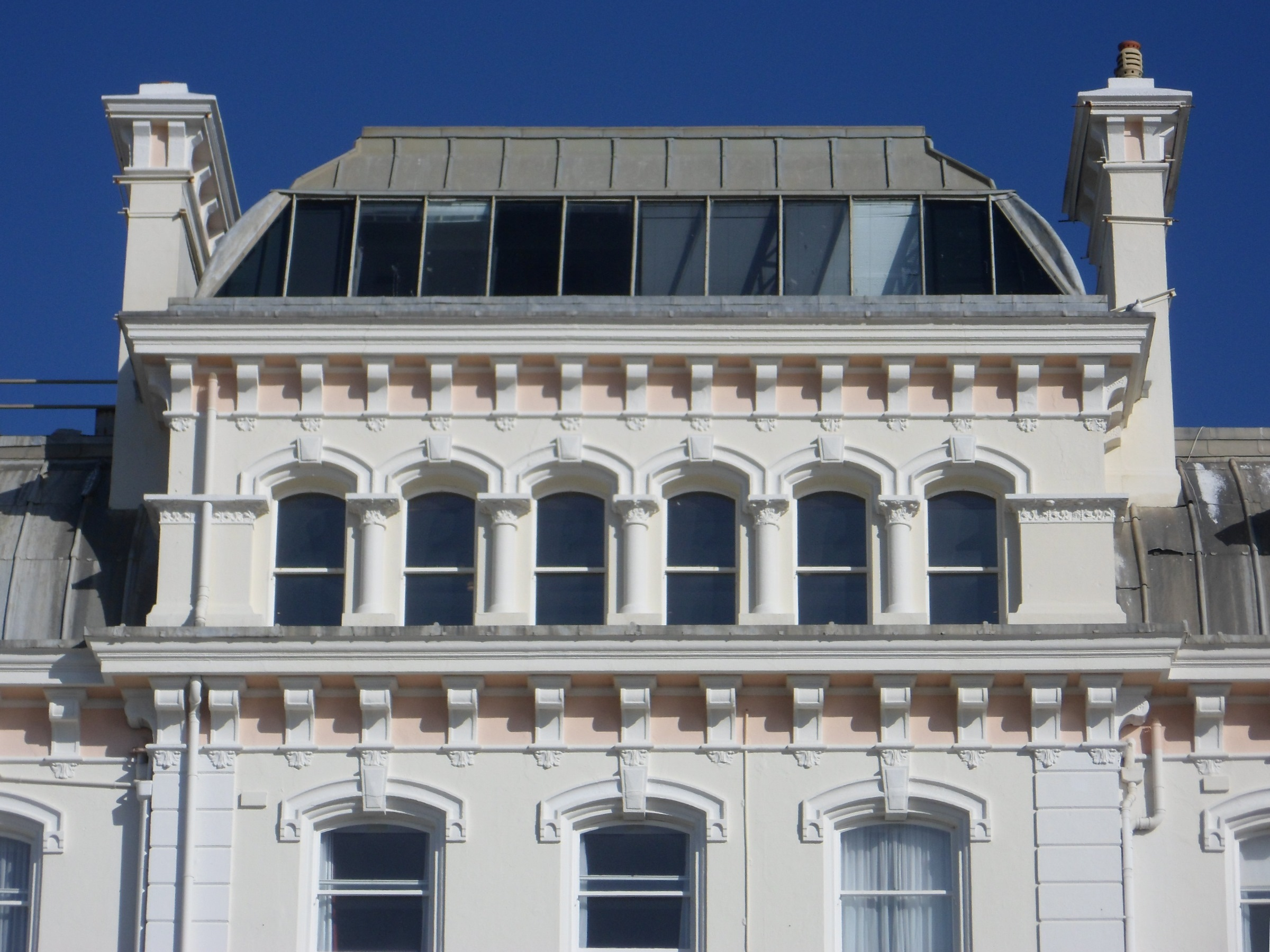
The windows have segmental arches. Those below the central mansard roof are set in a columned arcade.

Horatio Nelson Goulty designed the Norfolk Hotel in the French Renaissance Revival style, "perhaps to compete with the Grand" which, although larger, is similar in appearance. Closest in style to the Norfolk, though, were two contemporary hotels at major London railway stations that were designed by E.M. Barry: the Cannon Street Hotel (1861) and the Charing Cross Hotel (1864). The new building was taller than its predecessor, with five storeys and three large mansard roofs decorated with wrought ironwork. The south-facing façade is stuccoed, and its windows are set in segmental-arched architraves with prominent keystones.

The ground floor projects and is enclosed by a modern glazed lobby area. The main entrance has Corinthian columns on each side, supporting an entablature which in turn supports a balcony spanning the whole of the first floor. Individual cast iron balconies in the same style are set in front of each window at second- and third-floor level. The façade is of seven bays treated as a symmetrical 2–3–2 composition in which the central three bays project slightly and are flanked by pilasters. These three bays also rise to a taller height than the other sections by means of a sixth storey which has six narrow segmental-arched windows in the form of an arcade formed by engaged columns.

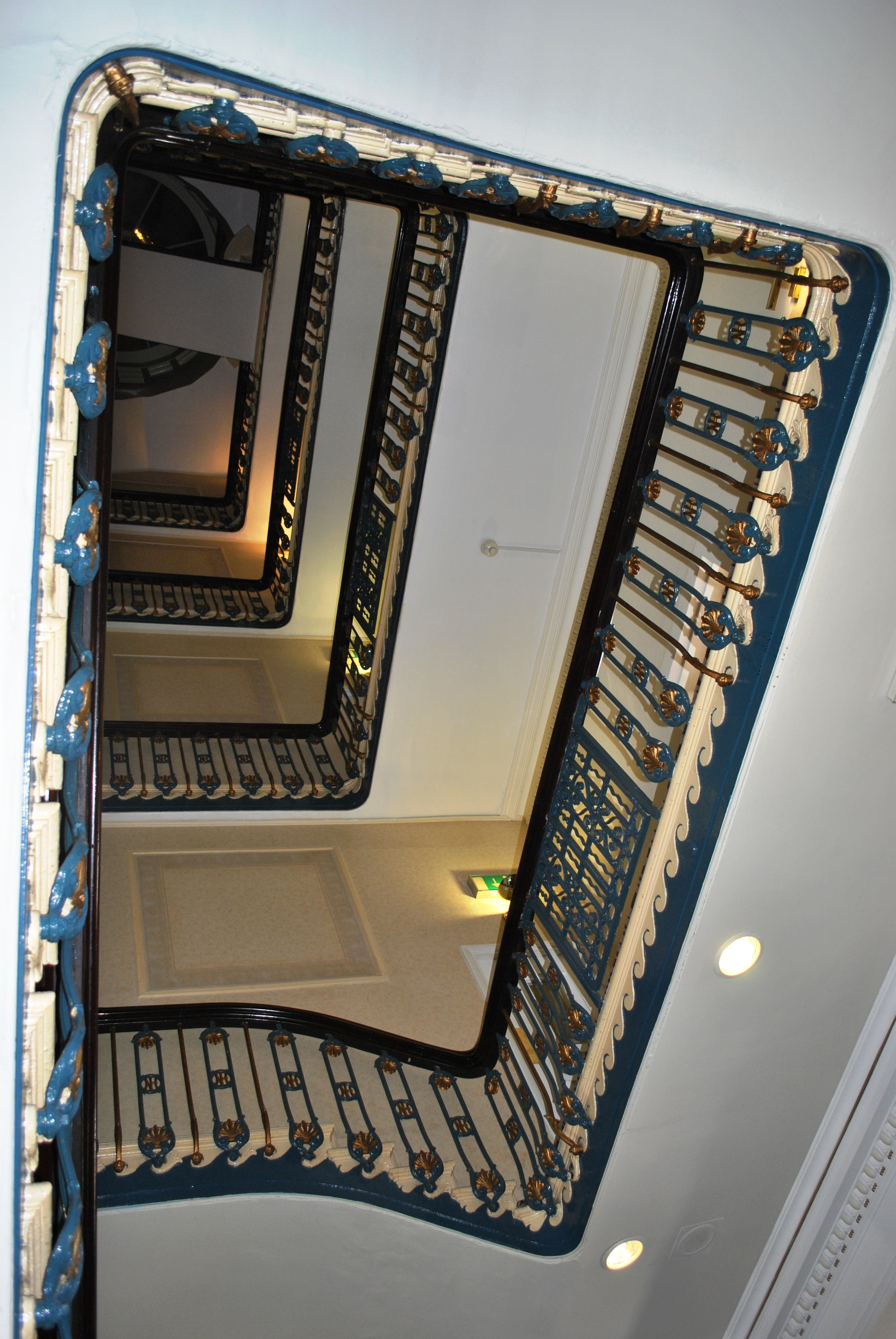
Norfolk Hotel, the cantilevered four-storey staircase

Little original work survives inside. There is cantilevered four-storey staircase with balusters made of cast iron and decorated with monograms (viz "NH") and openwork. The original "ascending omnibus" lift was part of the same structure; the gates survive. Near the staircase is a glazed dome with arabesque patterns.

To the rear of the hotel, the land redeveloped in 1985 with an ornamental lake and new rooms replaced a garage which had been built on the site of some livery stables. A 19th-century arched gateway survives from this, leading from the hotel into Norfolk Buildings (a short street); it has a black-painted horse's head on the keystone and the inscription rebuilt a.d. 1875.

== Facilities ==
As originally built in 1865, the Norfolk Hotel had 64 or 65 bedrooms. Extensions over the years have brought the total as of 2026 to 117. Three are suitable for wheelchair users, and all are non-smoking. All rooms have flat-screen televisions and Wi-Fi internet access; additional facilities in higher-priced rooms include newspapers, bathrobes, coffee machines and free films. There is 24-hour room service, a 24-hour bar (The Brasserie Bar) and a restaurant (The Brasserie).

== See also ==
- Grade II listed buildings in Brighton and Hove: N–O

== Bibliography ==
- Antram, Nicholas; Morrice, Richard (2008). Brighton and Hove. Pevsner Architectural Guides. London: Yale University Press. ISBN 978-0-300-12661-7.
- Arscott, David (2009). Brighton: A Very Peculiar History. Brighton: The Salariya Book Co. Ltd. ISBN 978-1-906714-89-5.
- Beevers, David; Roles, John (1993). A Pictorial History of Brighton. Derby: The Breedon Books Publishing Co. Ltd. ISBN 1-873626-54-1.
- Brighton Polytechnic. School of Architecture and Interior Design (1987). A Guide to the Buildings of Brighton. Macclesfield: McMillan Martin. ISBN 1-869-86503-0.
- Clunn, Harold P. (1953). The Capital-by-the-Sea. Brighton: The Southern Publishing Co Ltd.
- Collis, Rose (2010). The New Encyclopaedia of Brighton. (based on the original by Tim Carder) (1st ed.). Brighton: Brighton & Hove Libraries. ISBN 978-0-9564664-0-2.
- Dale, Antony (1991). Brighton Cemeteries. Brighton: Brighton Borough Council.
- Elleray, D. Robert (2004). Sussex Places of Worship. Worthing: Optimus Books. ISBN 0-9533132-7-1.
- Fines, Ken (2002). A History of Brighton & Hove. Chichester: Phillimore & Co. ISBN 1-86077-231-5.
- Gilbert, Edmund M. (1975) [1954]. Brighton: Old Ocean's Bauble. Hassocks: Flare Books. ISBN 0-901759-39-2.
- Musgrave, Clifford (1981). Life in Brighton. Rochester: Rochester Press. ISBN 0-571-09285-3.
- Sampson, Mark (1994). Brighton: History and Guide. Stroud: Alan Sutton Publishing. ISBN 0-7509-0476-3.
