= Hotel Norfolk =

US historic building in Norfolk, Nebraska

- U.S. National Register of Historic Places
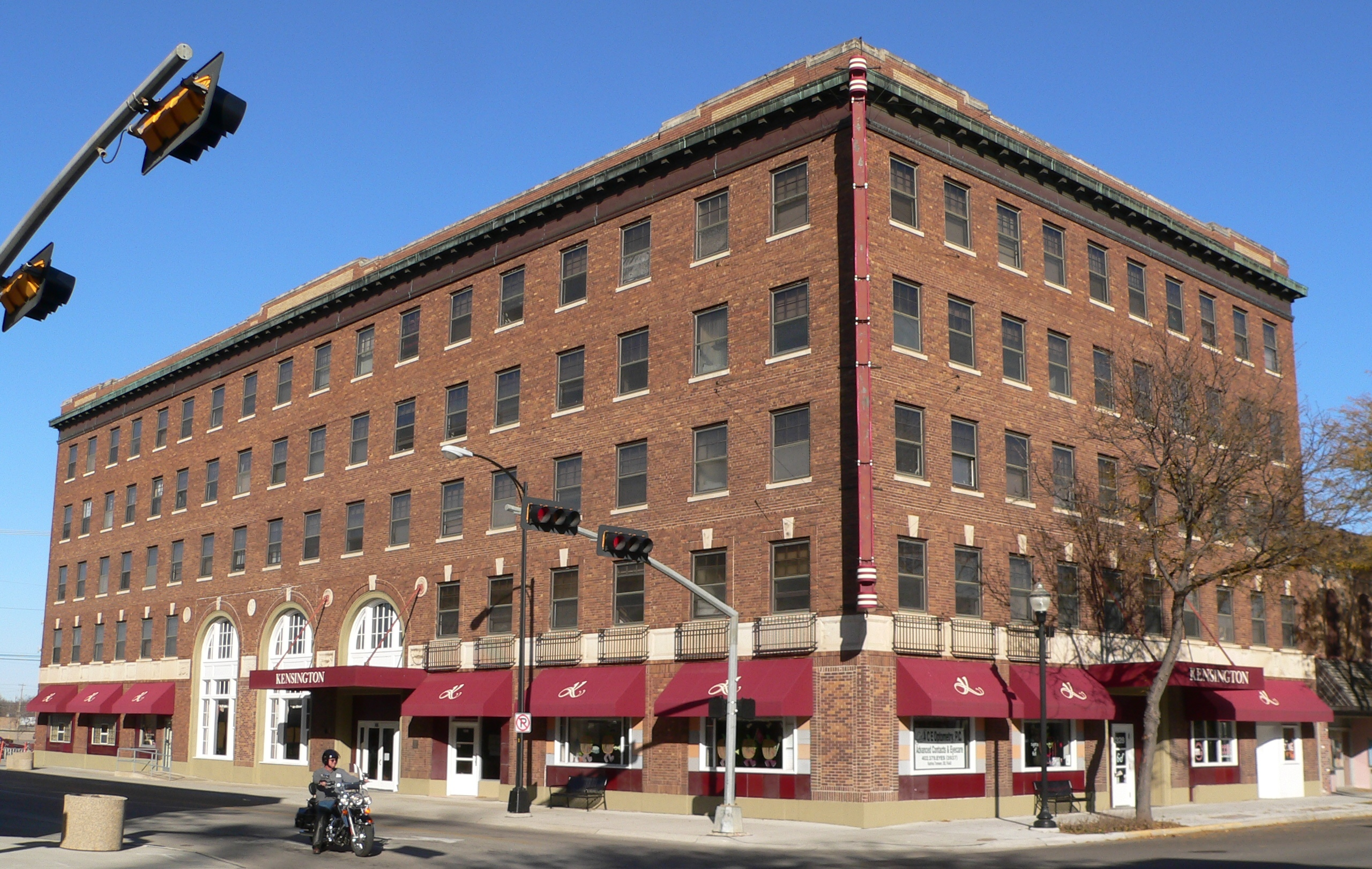
- View from the southwest

- Location within Nebraska Location within the United States
- Location: 108 N. Fourth St., Norfolk, Nebraska
- Coordinates: 42°1′59″N 97°24′40″W
- Area: Less than 1 acre (0.40 ha)
- Built: 1926
- Architect: Stevens, H.L., Co.
- Architectural style: Colonial Revival, Georgian Revival
- NRHP reference No.: 88002755
- Added to NRHP: December 1, 1988

The Hotel Norfolk, at 108 N. Fourth St. in Norfolk, Nebraska, was completed in 1926. It includes Colonial Revival and Georgian Revival architecture. It has also been known as Madison Apartments and as the Kensington Building. It was listed on the National Register of Historic Places in 1988.

It is significant as a "good example of the Georgian Revival influence in commercial structures of the early Twentieth Century", and as a "good representative of the small city hotels designed by the H.L. Stevens Company of Chicago which designed many hotels and apartments across the nation." It is also notable for having hosted WJAG, one of the oldest Midwest radio stations, during 1926–1944.

Notable visitors who have stayed in the hotel include Wendell Willkie, Thomas E. Dewey, Duke Ellington, John F. Kennedy, Jack Dempsey, Jascha Heifetz, Johnny Carson, and Ronald Reagan.
