= Amon Wilds =

English architect

- Born: 1762; Lewes, England
- Died: 12 September 1833 (aged 70–71); Brighton, England
- Occupation: Architect
- Buildings: Castle Place, Lewes; Holy Trinity Church, Brighton; The Temple, Brighton; Union Chapel, Brighton
- Projects: Extension to All Saints Church, Lewes; Regency Square; Kemp Town; Brunswick estate

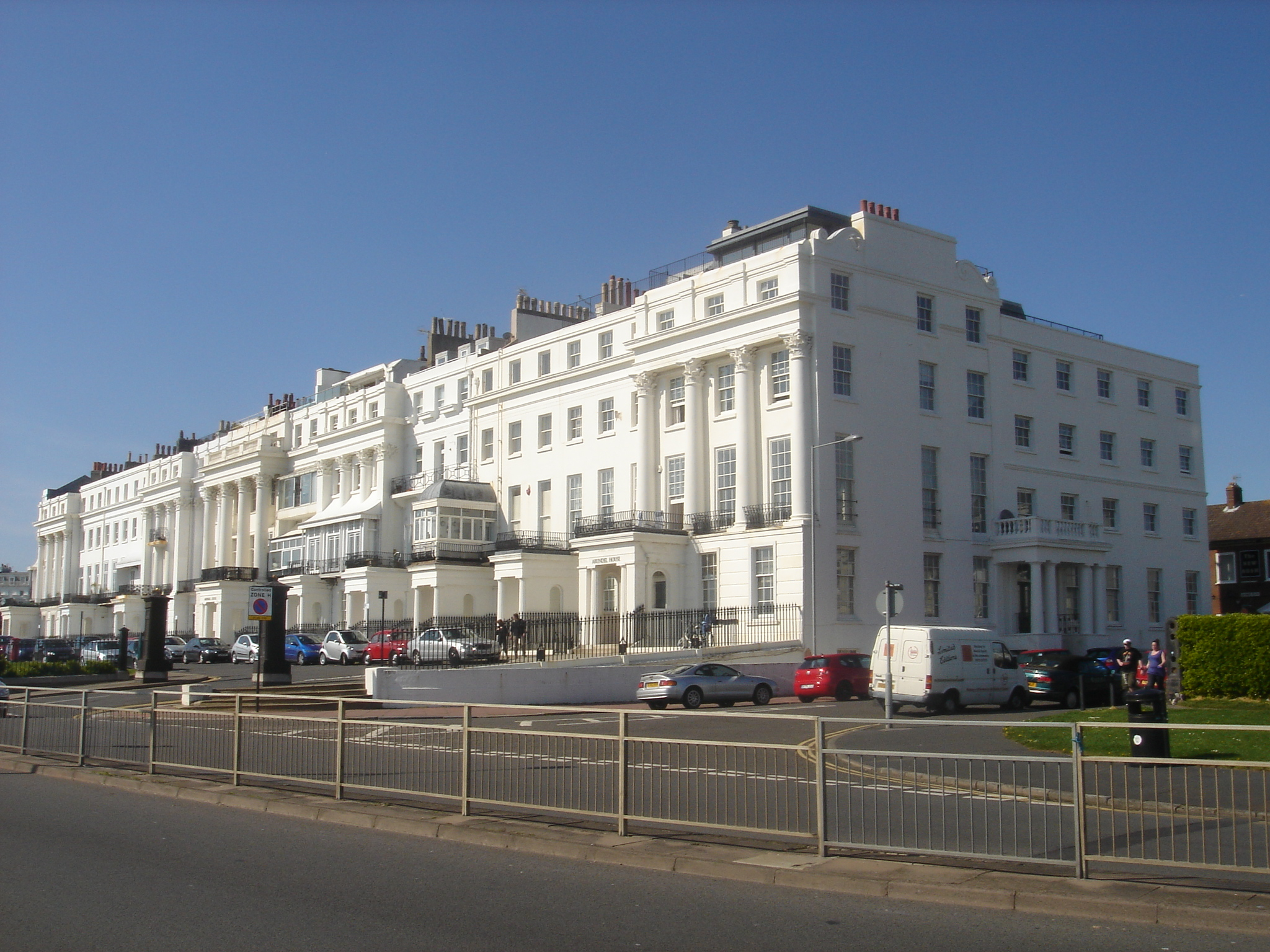
Amon Wilds was involved in the design of Arundel Terrace, the first part of Kemp Town to be completed.

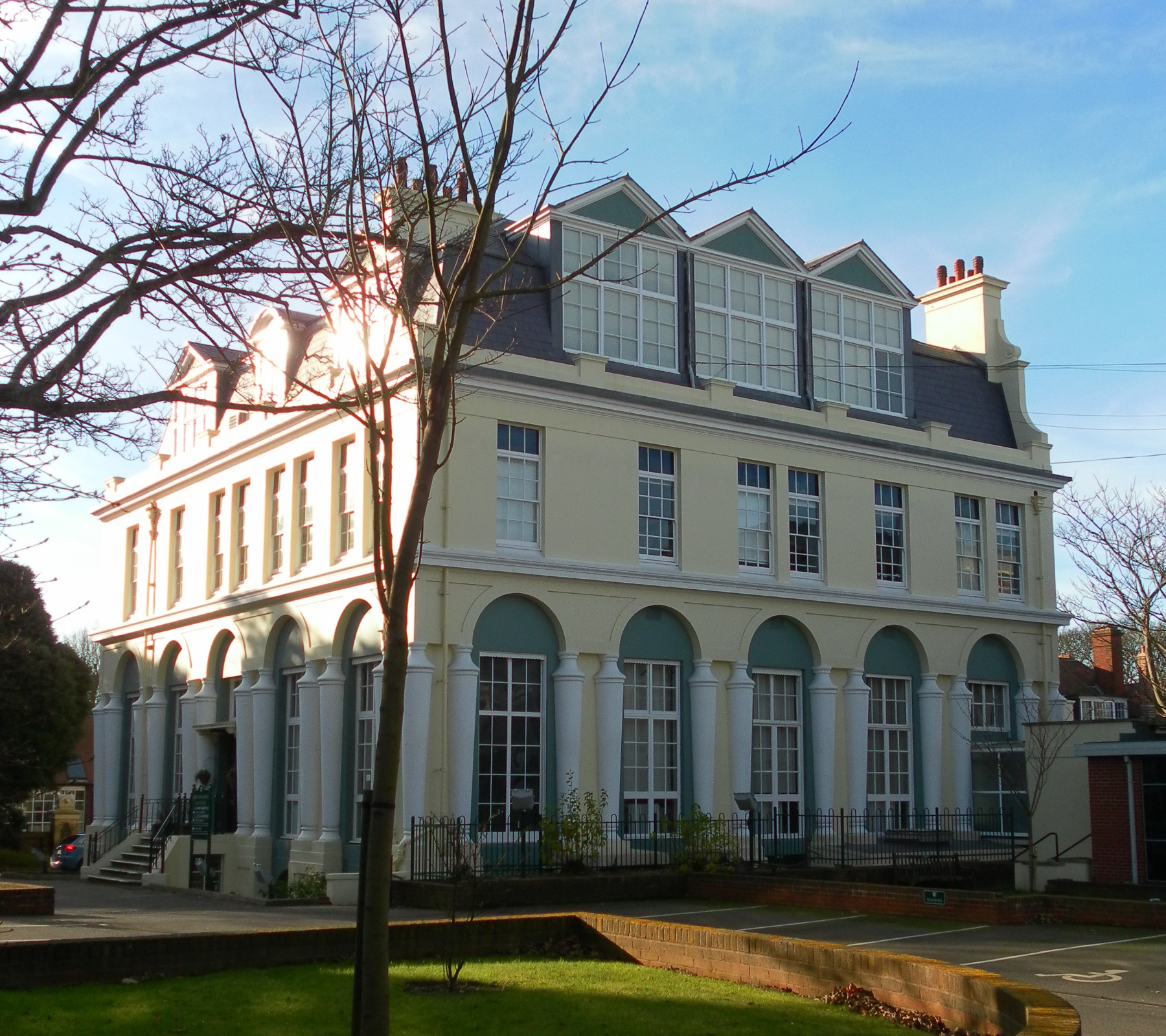
Wilds built The Temple for Thomas Read Kemp.

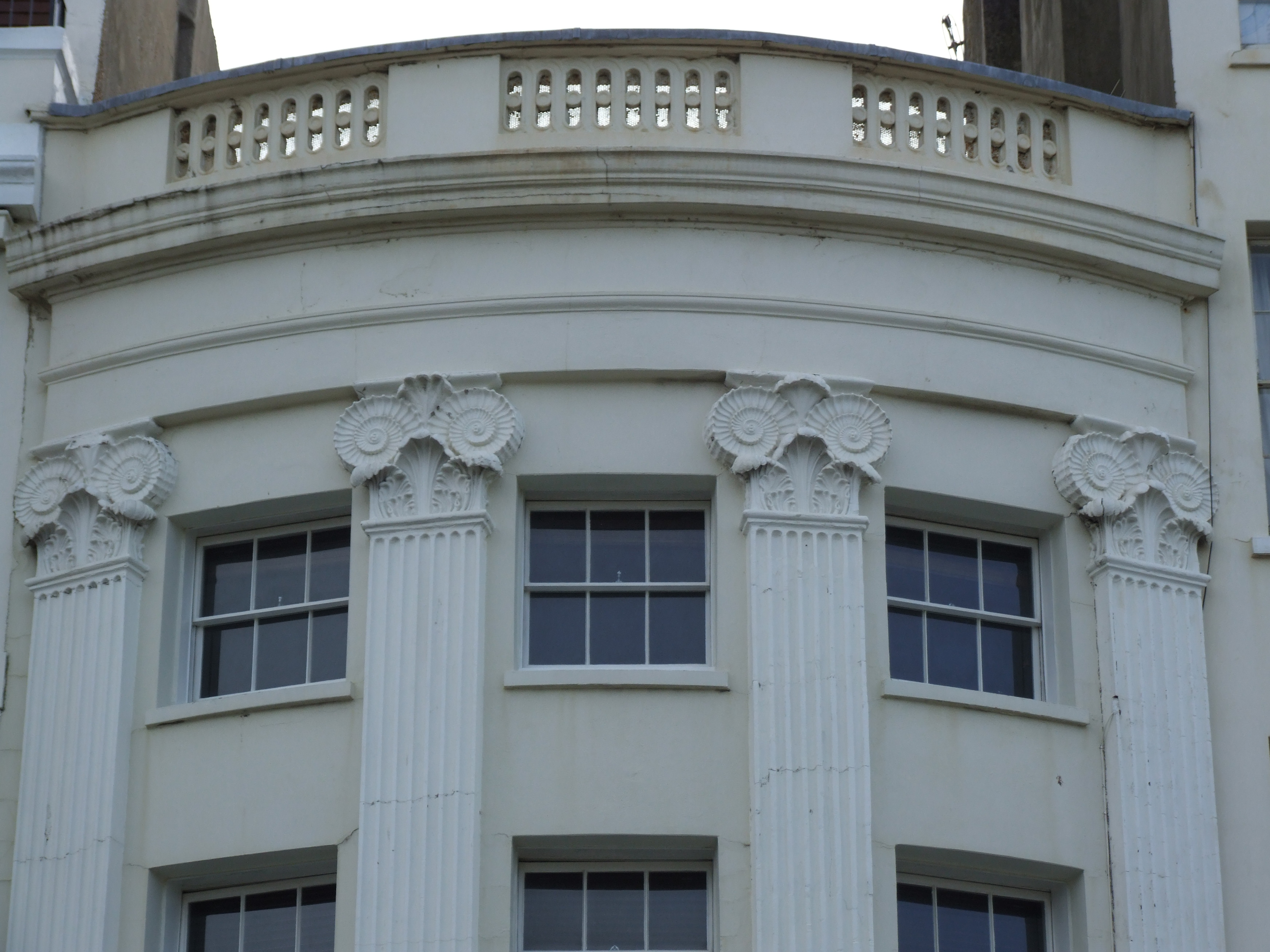
Ammonite capitals on a building in Old Steine, Brighton

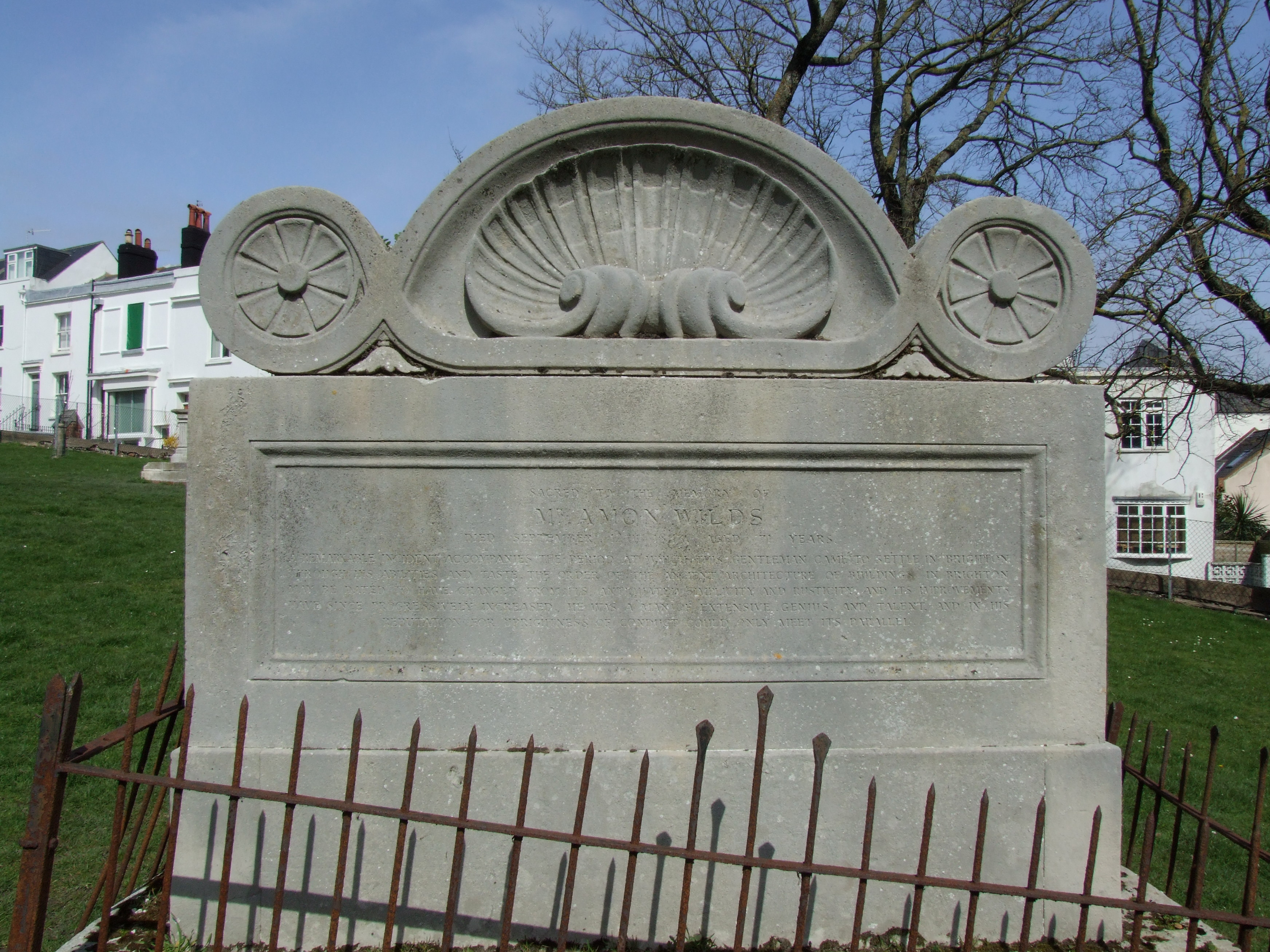
Amon Wilds's gravestone in St Nicholas' Churchyard

Amon Wilds (1762 – 12 September 1833) was an English architect and builder. He formed an architectural partnership with his son Amon Henry Wilds (Note: In this article, Amon Wilds is referred to as Wilds senior and his son Amon Henry Wilds as Wilds junior.) in 1806 and started working in the fashionable and growing seaside resort of Brighton, on the East Sussex coast, in 1815. After 1822, when the father-and-son partnership met and joined up with Charles Busby, they were commissioned—separately or jointly—to design a wide range of buildings in the town, which was experiencing an unprecedented demand for residential development and other facilities. Wilds senior also carried out much work on his own, but the description "Wilds and Busby" was often used on designs, making individual attribution difficult. Wilds senior and his partners are remembered most for his work in post-Regency Brighton, where most of their houses, churches and hotels built in a bold Regency style remain—in particular, the distinctive and visionary Kemp Town and Brunswick estates on the edges of Brighton, whose constituent parts are Grade I listed buildings.

== Life and activities ==
Wilds senior was born at Lewes, the county town of East Sussex, in 1762, and became a builder and carpenter. He later moved into the field of architecture and design, and after his son developed an interest in the same activities they formed a building firm in Lewes in about 1806. Wilds senior's first independent design commission was an extension to the nave of All Saints Church in Lewes, which he executed in red brick in contrast to the flint tower.

In 1810, he built Castle Place on the High Street, part of which was later converted into a house for the palaeontologist Gideon Mantell. This was the first of many buildings (mostly in Brighton) on which the Wilds' signature motif, the ammonite capital, was used. Consisting of an ammonite-shaped Ionic-style capital on top of a pilaster, this design was particularly liked by the Wilds because it represented a pun on their first names.

In 1815, both men moved to Brighton, where their partnership grew and took on more work. They continued to work in both towns until 1820, after which they concentrated exclusively on Brighton. By this time, Wilds senior had completed two buildings on behalf of Thomas Read Kemp, who later proposed and funded the Kemp Town estate. He was a wealthy Brighton resident who had been Member of Parliament for Lewes until 1816, when he resigned, left the Church of England and found a Nonconformist sect. He commissioned Wilds senior to build a chapel for him; although it was later reconsecrated as an Anglican church (under the name Holy Trinity Church) and has been altered externally, it still exists (as an art gallery) and is Grade II-listed. Wilds senior's design was Greek Revival, featuring a four-column portico of the Doric order and a large square tower.

In 1819, Kemp decided to move from Herstmonceux to Brighton, and asked Wilds senior to design a house for him on land he owned in what later became the Montpelier suburb. As its dimensions matched those of Solomon's Temple, it was called "The Temple". Square and two-storeyed, with five bays on each side and a recessed upper storey, it became a school in 1828 and is now the Brighton and Hove High School. It is listed at Grade II.

Charles Busby joined Wilds senior and his son in partnership soon after moving to Brighton in 1822. Their first major project was the execution of Kemp's grand scheme for a vast estate of high-quality houses on the cliffs east of Brighton, intended for the rapidly increasing number of rich people wanting to live in Brighton. By this time, Wilds junior was working independently most of the time, so Wilds senior and Busby received most of the credit for the design, planning and layout. Building work began in May 1823, but the plan—consisting of 250 houses—proved too ambitious: not enough people moved to the isolated site, and Kemp's money was running out. Only 106 were eventually built, 36 of which were complete by the time Wilds senior died.

Wilds also had some input in the design of the Brunswick estate, just over the border in Hove, which was conceived soon after Kemp Town's construction started; Charles Busby was more influential in the project, though, and recent research indicates that on the contract dated 11 November 1824 agreeing details of the construction of Brunswick Square and Terrace, Wilds senior had obliterated his name and stated that Busby should be considered responsible for the work.

From 1825 Wilds senior and Busby undertook more speculative building, for example at Marine Square and Portland Place; but Wilds senior was able to spend time on a complete redesign of the late 17th-century Union Chapel in Union Street. This was Brighton's oldest Nonconformist place of worship; it originally housed a Presbyterian community, then became an Independent chapel and later the Union Free Church (founded by the merger of two Congregational churches). In the 20th century it passed to a miners' mission and then the Elim Pentecostal Church, which occupied it until 1988, after which it became a pub. Amon Wilds gave the building a tall Greek Revival façade which dominates the lane it stands on; it has three Doric pilasters topped by a pediment, slightly tapering Greek-style windows and a triglyph. The interior was less imposing: a central pulpit was surrounded by pews in a semicircular pattern on a slight gradient.

Amon Wilds died at the age of 71 on 12 September 1833 and is buried in the churchyard at St Nicholas' Church, Brighton. His ornate gravestone was designed by his son.

The inscription reads:

Sacred to the memory of
Mr. Amon Wilds
Died 12 September 1833 Aged 71 Years
A remarkable incident accompanies the period at which this gentleman came to settle in Brighton.
Through his abilities and taste the order of the ancient architecture of buildings in Brighton
may be dated to have changed from its antiquated simplicity and rusticity and its improvements
have since progressively increased. He was a man of extensive genius and talent and in his
reputation for uprightness of conduct could only meet its parallel.

== See also ==
- Buildings and architecture of Brighton and Hove

== Bibliography ==
- Antram, Nicholas; Morrice, Richard (2008). Brighton and Hove. Pevsner Architectural Guides. London: Yale University Press. ISBN 978-0-300-12661-7.
- Berry, Sue (2005). Georgian Brighton. Chichester: Phillimore & Co. Ltd. ISBN 1-86077-342-7.
- Carder, Timothy (1990). The Encyclopaedia of Brighton. Lewes: East Sussex County Libraries. ISBN 0-86147-315-9.
- Dale, Antony (1950). The History and Architecture of Brighton. Brighton: Bredin & Heginbothom Ltd.
- Dale, Antony (1989). Brighton Churches. London: Routledge. ISBN 0-415-00863-8.
- Gilbert, Edmund M. (1954). Brighton: Old Ocean's Bauble. Hassocks: Flare Books. ISBN 0-901759-39-2.
- Middleton, Judy (2001). Brunswick Town. (monograph)
- Musgrave, Clifford (1981). Life in Brighton. Rochester: Rochester Press. ISBN 0-571-09285-3.
- Nairn, Ian; Pevsner, Nikolaus (1965). The Buildings of England: Sussex. Harmondsworth: Penguin Books. ISBN 0-14-071028-0.
- A Guide to the Buildings of Brighton. School of Architecture and Interior Design, Brighton Polytechnic. Macclesfield: McMillan Martin. 1987. ISBN 1-869865-03-0.
