= Elbert B. Watson =

American architect

Elbert B. Watson (1879-1963), commonly known as E.B. Watson, was an architect based in Norfolk, Nebraska.

Several of his works are listed on the U.S. National Register of Historic Places for their architecture.

He was born November 7, 1879, in Iowa City, Iowa. He studied at Iowa State University, in Ames, Iowa. He died February 19, 1963.

Works include:

- Norfolk Municipal Airport Administration Building, Norfolk, Moderne style, NRHP-listed
- Norfolk Municipal Auditorium (1939–40)
- Koenigstein Block and Granada Theater (1927)
- Three schools in the area of Norfolk
- Athletic Park Band Shell in Plainview, Nebraska, NRHP-listed
- Knox County Courthouse in Center, Nebraska, NRHP-listed
- Rock County Courthouse in Bassett, Nebraska, NRHP-listed

The practice absorbed the business of Norfolk architect James C. Stitt.
