= Karl Stefan Memorial Airport Administration Building =

- U.S. National Register of Historic Places
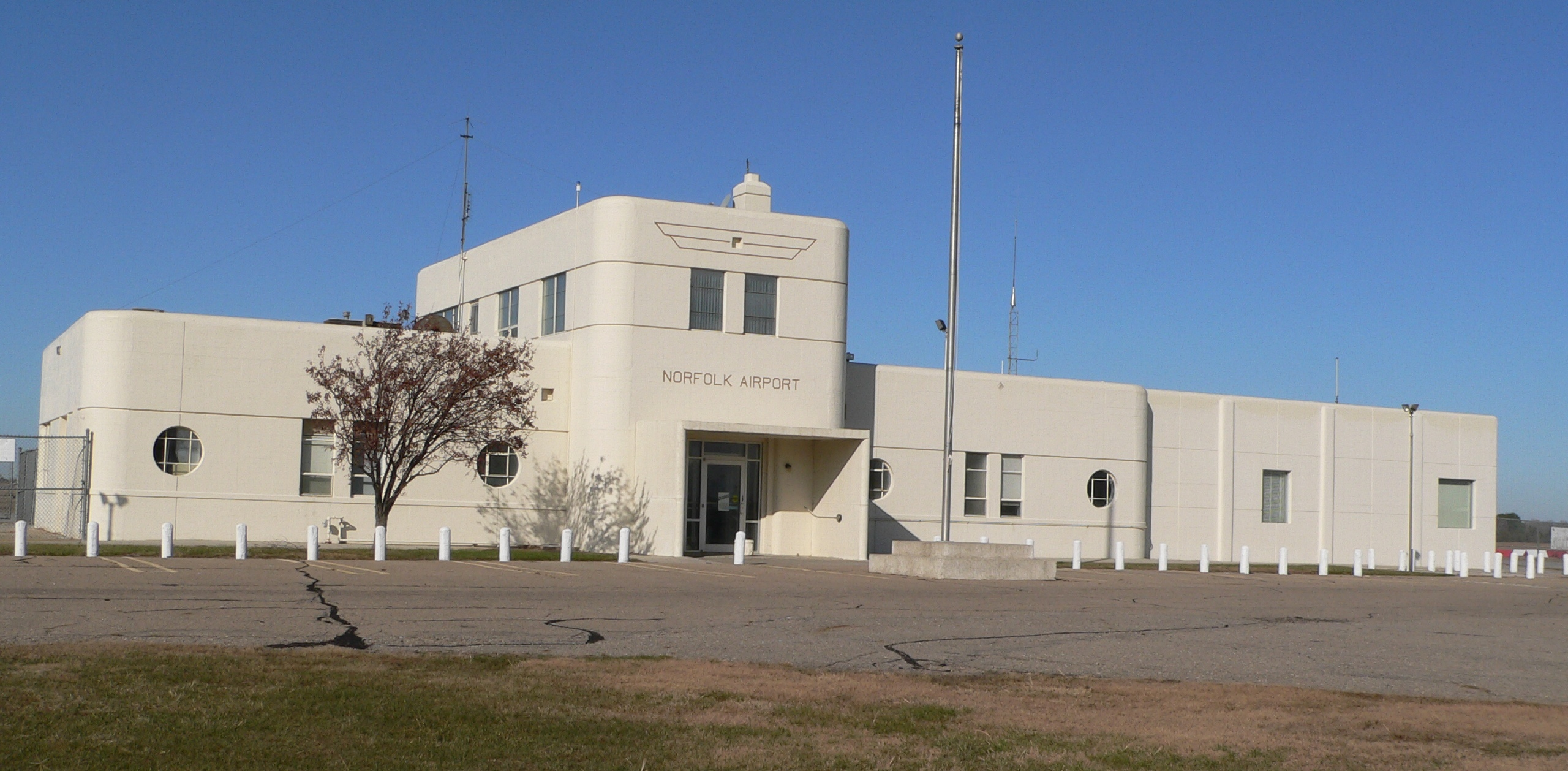

- Location within Nebraska Location within the United States
- Location: 4100 S. 13th St., Norfolk, Nebraska
- Coordinates: 41.984722°N 97.429722°W
- Area: less than one acre
- Built: 1946
- Architect: E.B. Watson
- Architectural style: Moderne
- NRHP reference No.: 02000767
- Added to NRHP: July 11, 2002

The Karl Stefan Memorial Airport Administration Building at the Norfolk Regional Airport in Norfolk in Madison County, Nebraska was built in 1946. It was listed on the National Register of Historic Places in 2002.

It was designed by Norfolk architect Elbert B. Watson (1879-1963) in Moderne style. It has also been known as Norfolk Municipal Airport Administration Building.

Watson also designed the Athletic Park Band Shell in Plainview, Nebraska, also NRHP-listed in Madison County, and the NRHP-listed Knox County Courthouse in Center, Nebraska, and the Rock County Courthouse in Bassett, Nebraska.
