= Fremont, Elkhorn and Missouri Valley Railroad Depot =

Fremont, Elkhorn and Missouri Valley Railroad Depot may refer to:

- Fremont, Elkhorn and Missouri Valley Railroad Depot (Dwight, Nebraska), listed on the National Register of Historic Places in Butler County, Nebraska
- Fremont, Elkhorn and Missouri Valley Railroad Depot (Plainview, Nebraska), listed on the National Register of Historic Places in Pierce County, Nebraska
