= Norfolk Public Library =

Norfolk Public Library may refer to:

- The Norfolk Library (Connecticut), a charitable organization open to the public
- Norfolk Public Library (Nebraska)
- Norfolk, Massachusetts Public Library
- Norfolk Public Library, operated by the City of Norfolk, Virginia
