= Miller Hall =

Miller Hall may refer to:

- Miller Hall (Chadron, Nebraska), listed on the National Register of Historic Places in Dawes County, Nebraska
- Miller Hall (Waynesburg University), Greene County, Pennsylvania
