= James C. Stitt =

American architect

James C. Stitt (1866-1949) was an architect based in Norfolk, Nebraska.

At least seven of his works are listed on the U.S. National Register of Historic Places.

He was born September 28, 1866, in Medusa, New York. He died January 10, 1949.

His business was eventually absorbed into that of Norfolk architect Elbert B. Watson (1879-1963).

Works include:

- Cedar County Courthouse (1891), Broadway Ave. between Centre and Franklin Sts. Hartington, Nebraska, NRHP-listed
- Norfolk Carnegie Library (1910), 803 W. Norfolk Ave. Norfolk, Nebraska, NRHP-listed
- Norfolk Masonic Temple (1933), 907 W. Norfolk Ave. Norfolk, Nebraska, NRHP-listed
- Plainview Carnegie Library (1917), 102 S. Main St. Plainview, Nebraska, NRHP-listed
- Stubbs-Ballah House (1917), NRHP-listed
- Miller Hall (1920), 10th and Main Sts. Chadron, Nebraska, NRHP-listed
- Library (1929), 10th and Main Sts. Chadron, Nebraska, NRHP-listed
