= Plainview station =

- Fremont, Elkhorn and Missouri Valley Railroad Depot
- U.S. National Register of Historic Places
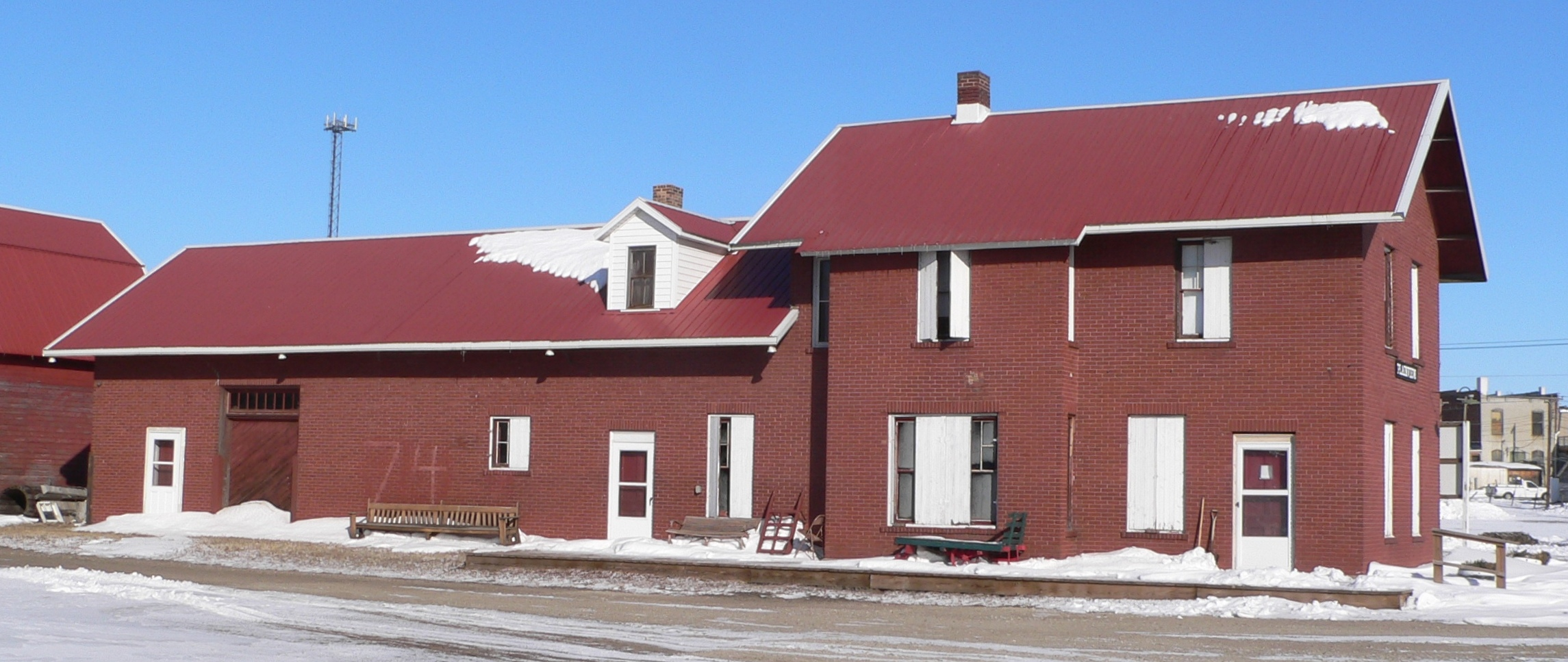
- Photo in 2009

- Location within Nebraska Location within the United States
- Location: 304 S. Main St., Plainview, Nebraska
- Coordinates: 42.348056°N 97.793333°W
- Area: less than one acre
- Built: 1880
- NRHP reference No.: 05001291
- Added to NRHP: November 16, 2005

The Fremont, Elkhorn and Missouri Valley Railroad Depot (also known as the Chicago and North Western Railway Depot) is a historic train station on South Main Street in Plainview, Pierce County, Nebraska. Built in 1880, it was listed on the National Register of Historic Places in 2005. In 2009, it was serving as the Plainview Historical Museum.

It was built to serve the Fremont, Elkhorn and Missouri Valley Railroad, which was later absorbed into the Chicago and North Western Railway. No tracks remain in the vicinity of the depot building.

It is a two-story gabled wood-frame building with a brick facade on a concrete foundation, with a 92 by 23 feet (28.0 m × 7.0 m) plan.

== See also ==
- Fremont, Elkhorn and Missouri Valley Railroad Depot (Dwight, Nebraska), also NRHP-listed

Preceding station	Chicago and North Western Railway	Following station
Creighton toward Wood	Wood – Norfolk	Foster toward Norfolk
