= Mari Sandoz High Plains Heritage Center =

- Library
- U.S. National Register of Historic Places
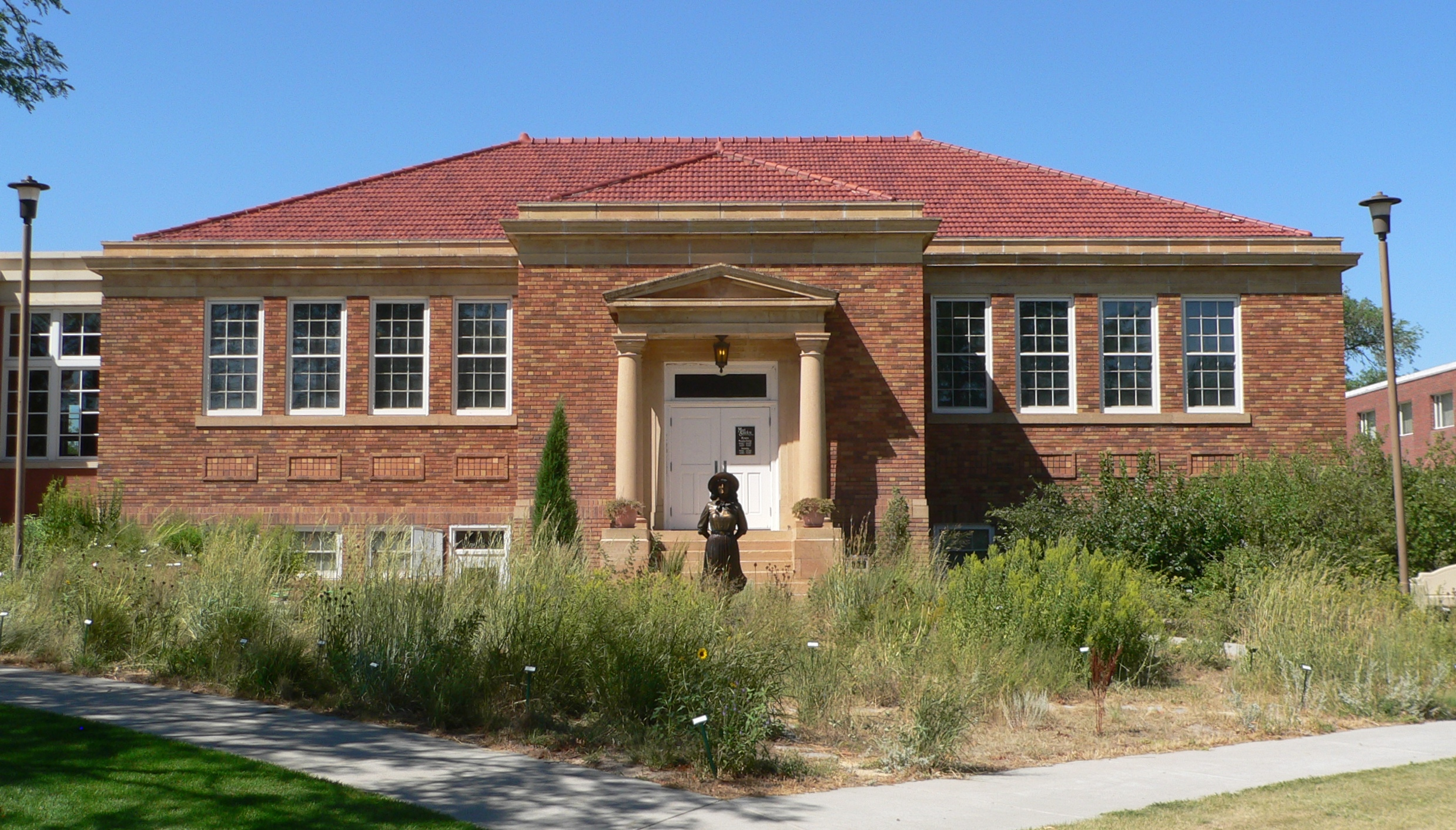
- Sandoz Center: historic library building, with statue of Sandoz in front

- Location within Nebraska Location within the United States
- Location: Chadron State College campus, Chadron, Nebraska
- Coordinates: 42°49′11.8″N 103°0′10.3″W
- Built: 1929
- Architect: J. C. Stitt
- Architectural style: Classical Revival
- MPS: Chadron State College Historic Buildings TR
- NRHP reference No.: 83001084
- Added to NRHP: September 8, 1983

The Mari Sandoz High Plains Heritage Center is a museum dedicated to the life and works of author Mari Sandoz, and to the High Plains region of the western United States, in which Sandoz grew up, and which was the setting of many of her fictional and non-fictional works. The Center is located on the campus of Chadron State College in Chadron, Nebraska. It occupies the college's former library building, which is listed in the National Register of Historic Places.

== History ==
=== Chadron State College ===
In 1909, the Nebraska state legislature authorized the construction of a new normal school in what was then the Sixth Congressional District. In the following year, the Nebraska Board of Education chose Chadron as the site for the new school. Classes began in the summer of 1911, with an enrollment of 111 students.

In 1921, the legislature passed a bill granting the state normal schools the status of teachers colleges. In 1949, the school officially became the Nebraska State Teachers College at Chadron; in 1963, it was given its current name of Chadron State College.

From the founding in 1911 to 1938, seven buildings were constructed on the campus. After that, no new major construction was undertaken until 1953. The first seven buildings were the Administration Building, begun in 1910 and dedicated in 1911; a women's dormitory, now Sparks Hall, built in 1914; the gymnasium, now Miller Hall, built in 1920; the "training school", now the Hildreth Education Building, built in 1926; a library, built in 1929; a new women's dormitory, Women's Hall, now Edna Work Hall, built in 1932; and Crites Hall, built in 1938.

The 1929 library served as such until 1967, when the new Reta King library was opened. The old library building then became the Media Center, housing the campus print shop and educational television studio.

In 1983, five of the original seven buildings on campus, including the 1929 library, were named to the National Register of Historic Places under the collective designation "Chadron State College Historic Buildings TR". The other two, Administration and Hildreth, had been too much altered for inclusion in the Register. The nomination was principally due to the college's status as the primary educational institution in western Nebraska.

=== Mari Sandoz ===
Mari Sandoz (1896–1966) was born and grew up in Sheridan County in the Nebraska Sandhills. In 1935, she published Old Jules, a biography of her homesteader father Jules Sandoz. Most of her subsequent works of fiction and nonfiction dealt with the history of the High Plains and its Native Americans, explorers, and settlers.

Shortly before her death, Sandoz gave much of her writing material to the University of Nebraska–Lincoln. Most of her papers are now at the UNL Archives and Special Collections. Additional manuscripts, correspondence, notes, and other papers are preserved by the Nebraska State Historical Society.

After Sandoz's death, her sister Caroline Sandoz Pifer was named her executrix. Pifer brought Sandoz's personal papers and belongings from Sandoz's last residence, in New York City, to Sheridan County. For over 20 years, she maintained a Mari Sandoz Room, a museum, and a bookshop in and near Gordon, Nebraska.

In 1971, the Mari Sandoz Heritage Fund was created at Chadron State; the college provided a room to house donations of Sandoz memorabilia. Through the 1970s and 1980s, several abortive efforts were made to establish a Sandoz center at the college. In 1988, the Mari Sandoz Heritage Society was reactivated, with the goal of developing a center, and in 1991 a Mari Sandoz Heritage Room was opened in the Administration Building. A year later, fundraising began for a Mari Sandoz Center for High Plains Research, to be located in the former Chadron State Library; and in 2002, the Center opened under its present name.

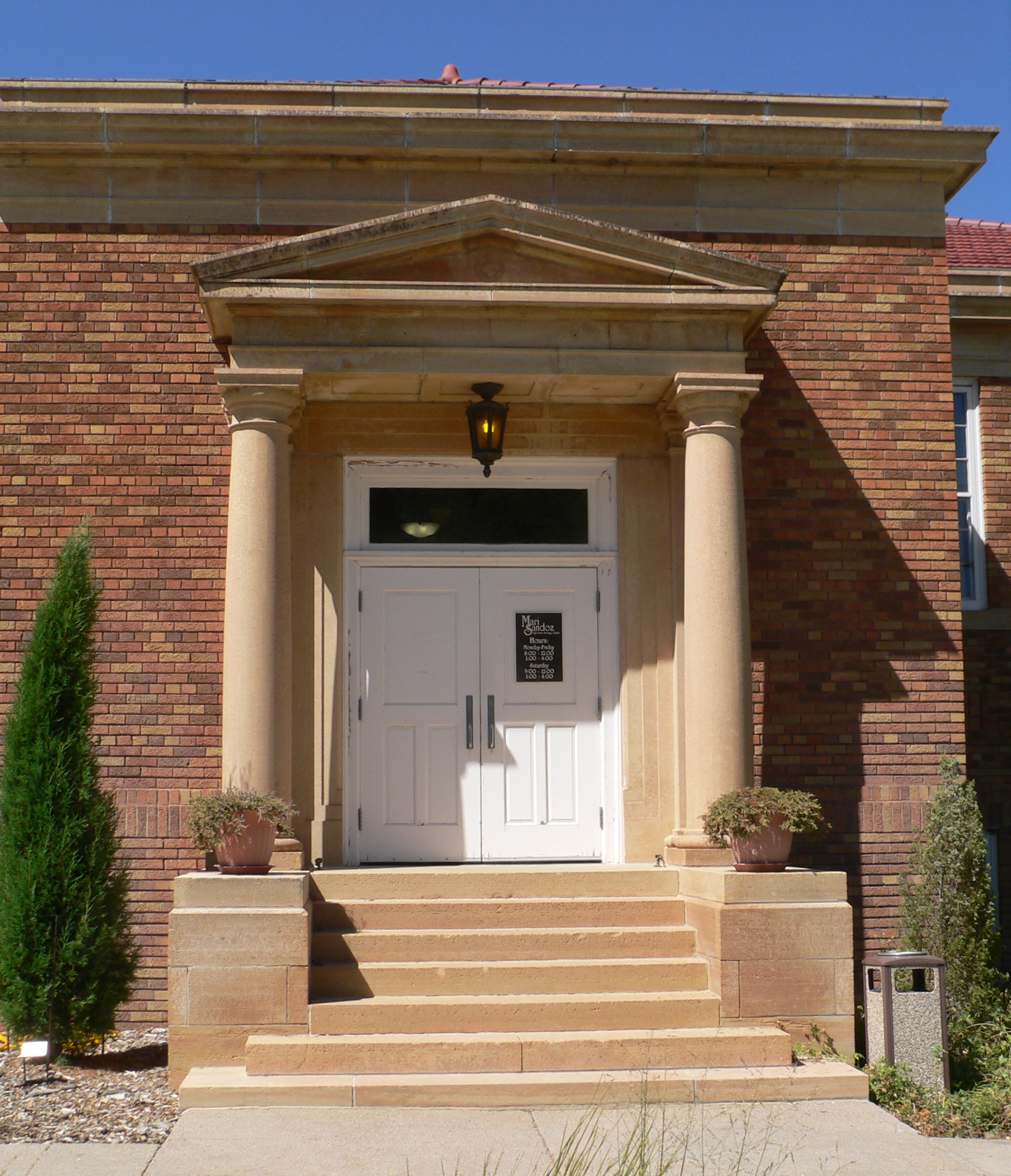
Entrance of 1929 library building, with Doric columns and pediment

== Mari Sandoz High Plains Heritage Center ==
=== Buildings and grounds ===
The core of the Center is the former college library. The building was designed by Norfolk, Nebraska architect J. C. Stitt, and built in 1929. Its design is typical of libraries of the first quarter of the 20th century, as recommended by professional librarians and the Carnegie Corporation. The building consists of a single story above a raised basement, a form that provided two floors of usable space without the need for a two-story building. The original floor plan is one commonly used in contemporary Carnegie libraries, consisting of a single large reading room, a vestibule in a projection from the front of the building, and bookstacks and a librarian's room in a rear projection. Also in keeping with the usual design of Carnegie libraries, the building's Neoclassical style is simple, with few decorative details. The front entrance is flanked by Doric columns supporting a pediment; there is a simple stone cornice, and a hipped tile roof.

Adjoining the library building on the south is the Chicoine Atrium, which provides an additional 2,400 square feet (220 m^{2}) of space. The building was named after donors Vernon P. and Madge Fortune Chicoine. Its cornerstone was laid in 2002.

A life-sized bronze statue of Sandoz by artist George Lundeen stands in front of the 1929 library. Several plant collections, collectively known as the Heritage Gardens, are located around and near the buildings.

=== Holdings and exhibits ===
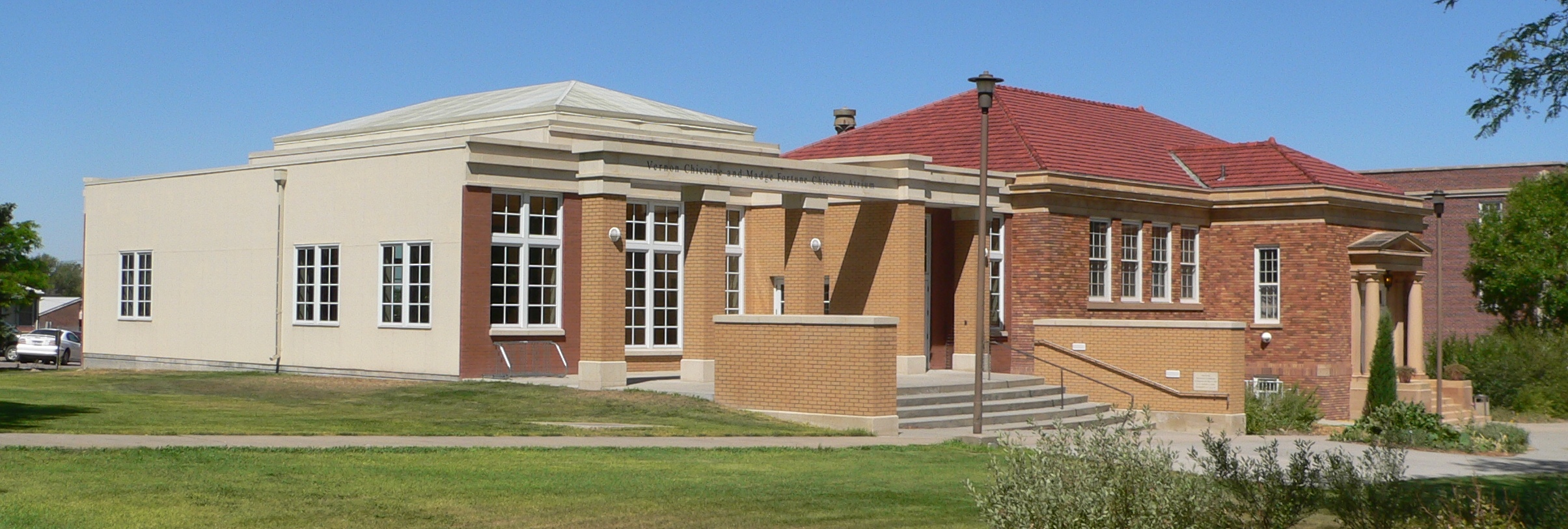
Mari Sandoz High Plains Heritage Center, seen from the southeast. The Chicoine Atrium is at left; behind and to the right is the 1929 library building.

The Center holds a number of items directly related to Sandoz, including manuscripts, sound recordings, and personal effects from Sandoz's New York apartment. Its collection also includes a number of oral histories of regional ranching families, and a 6000-volume library focusing on the High Plains region.

Permanent exhibits include a gallery dedicated to Sandoz's life and literature; one for the history of cattle ranching on the High Plains; and one devoted to the paleontology of the Sandhills.

Exhibits both indoors and outdoors describe the botany of the region. Sandoz's younger sister Flora Rosa Sandoz was a trained botanist, who spent most of her life in the Sandhills; an interactive kiosk in the Center displays her photographs of local wildflowers, along with her comments on them. The Heritage Gardens consist of several distinct collections, including fruit trees descended from those grown by the Sandoz family, plants brought to the High Plains by early settlers, and native plants used by the Lakota Sioux. The statue of Sandoz is surrounded by Sandhills prairie plants, some of which were collected near her grave in Sheridan County.

=== Visitors ===
The Center is open year-round; it reports an average of over 5,000 visitors per year.
