= Plainview Carnegie Library =

- U.S. National Register of Historic Places
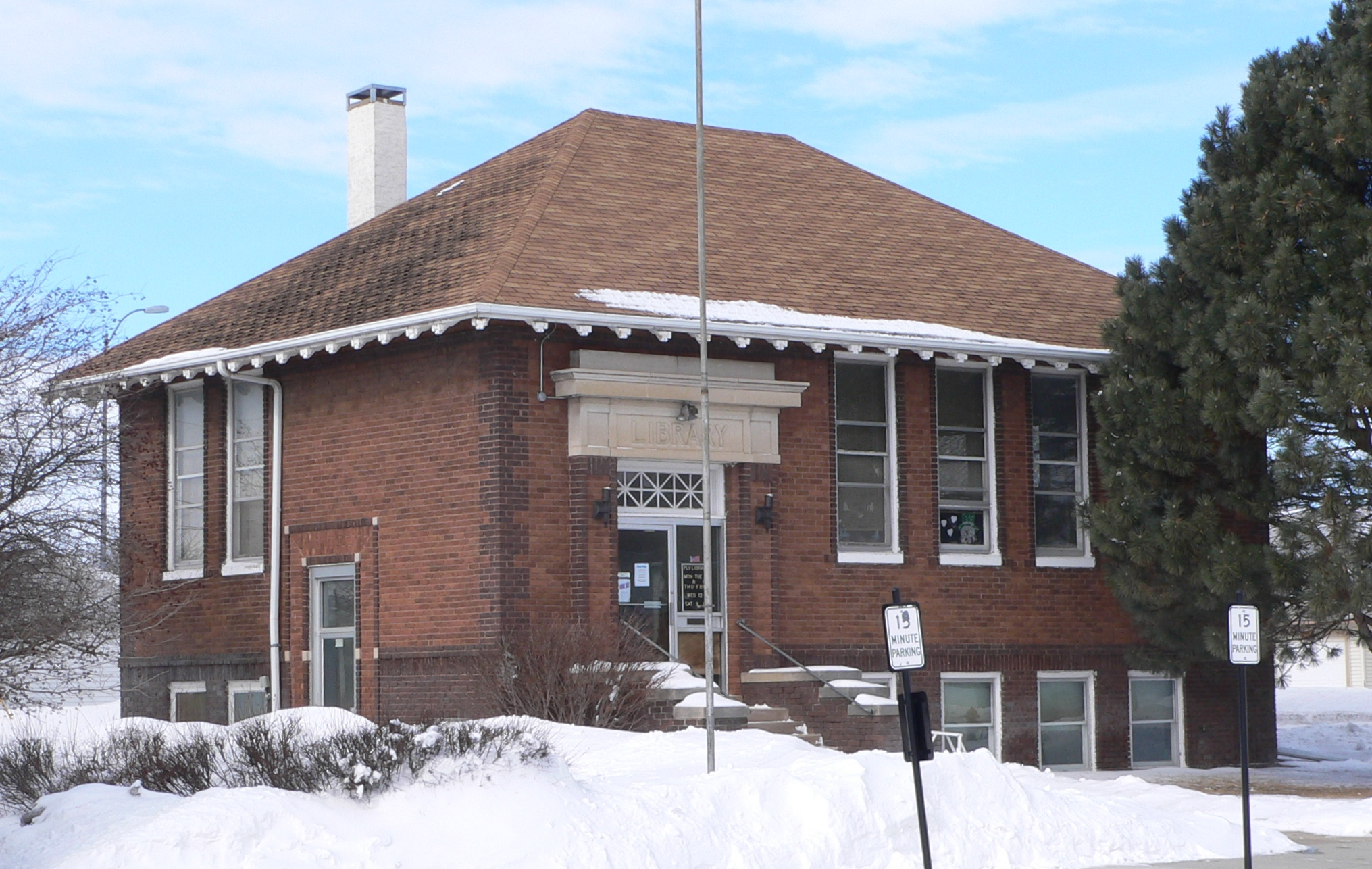

- Location within Nebraska Location within the United States
- Location: Plainview, Nebraska
- Coordinates: 42°21′2″N 97°47′36″W
- Area: 0.4 acres (0.16 ha)
- Built: 1916-1917
- Built by: Houx, Frank T.
- Architect: J.C. Stitt
- Architectural style: Prairie School
- MPS: Carnegie Libraries in Nebraska MPS
- NRHP reference No.: 93000056
- Added to NRHP: February 25, 1993

The Plainview Carnegie Library in Plainview, Nebraska is a Carnegie library which was built in 1916–1917. It was listed on the National Register of Historic Places in 1993.

It is a one-story 30 by 42 feet (9.1 m × 12.8 m) brick building with a raised basement. It has a hipped roof with wide eaves and modillions. It has Prairie Style details. It was designed by Norfolk, Nebraska architect J.C. Stitt and built by contractor Frank T. Houx.

Its lower level was renovated to include a children's reading room in 1977. In 1992 the building still served as a library.

Plainview was one of 68 communities in Nebraska that were awarded Carnegie library grant funds.
