= Stubbs–Ballah House =

Historic house in Nebraska, United States

- U.S. National Register of Historic Places
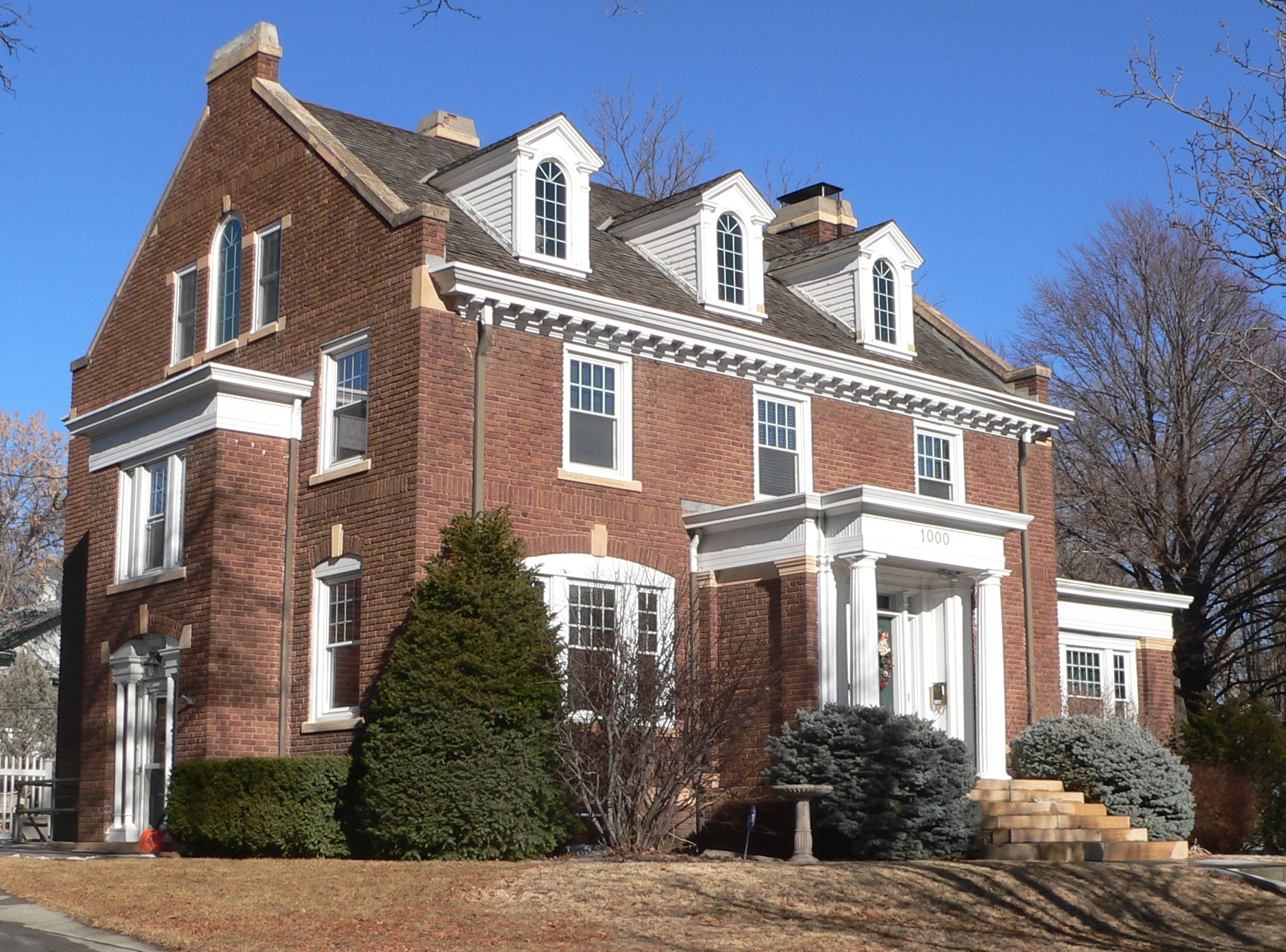

- Location within Nebraska Location within the United States
- Location: 1000 Prospect Ave., Norfolk, Nebraska
- Coordinates: 42.036541°N 97.420864°W
- Built: 1917
- Architect: James C. Stitt
- NRHP reference No.: 13001021
- Added to NRHP: December 31, 2013

The Stubbs–Ballah House in Norfolk in Madison County, Nebraska, USA, was built in 1917. It was listed on the National Register of Historic Places in 2013.

It was designed by the architect James C. Stitt.

Congressman Mike and Mandi Flood lived in the house from 2006 to 2012. Congressman Flood served as Speaker of the Nebraska Unicameral Legislature from 2007 to 2013.
