= Cedar County Courthouse (Nebraska) =

- U.S. National Register of Historic Places
- U.S. Historic district
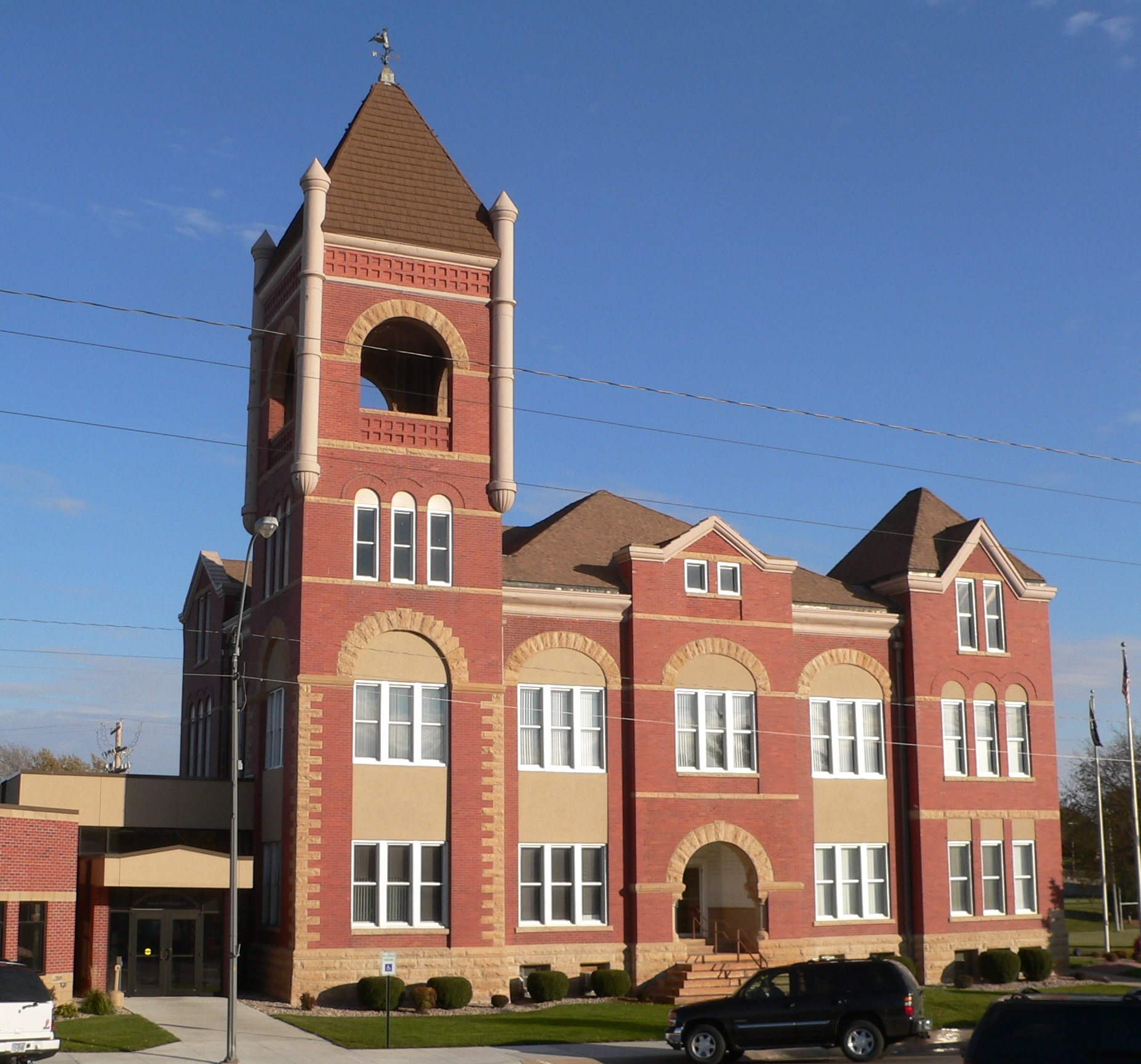

- Location within Nebraska Location within the United States
- Interactive map showing the location of Cedar County Courthouse
- Location: Broadway Ave. between Centre and Franklin Sts., Hartington, Nebraska
- Coordinates: 42°37′12″N 97°15′50″W
- Area: 1 acre (0.40 ha)
- Built: 1891
- Architect: J. C. Stitt
- Architectural style: Romanesque
- MPS: County Courthouses of Nebraska MPS
- NRHP reference No.: 89002214
- Added to NRHP: January 10, 1990

The Cedar County Courthouse in Hartington, Nebraska dates from 1891. It was listed on the National Register of Historic Places in 1990.

Out of 18 "County Capitol" type courthouses built in Nebraska during 1888 to 1907, this one is relatively unusual for having a tower in a corner, rather than centered.

It is a Romanesque Revival-style building. It was designed by J. C. Stitt, an untrained architect from Norfolk, Nebraska.
