= Norfolk Public Library (Nebraska) =

Public library in Norfolk, Nebraska, U.S.

- 42.03710477659416°N 97.4112885128569°W
- Location: 308 W Prospect Ave., Norfolk, Nebraska, U.S.
- Established: 1906; 120 years ago

Collection
- Size: 100,327

Access and use
- Circulation: 260,499
- Population served: 12,824

Other information
- Website: norfolkne.gov/government/departments/library/

Norfolk Public Library is a public library in Norfolk, Nebraska, United States. The library was formed in 1906 and was a subscription library located in the Bishop Block. It later moved to the Carnegie library in 1911. The library moved to its current location in 1977.

== History ==
- Norfolk Carnegie Library
- U.S. National Register of Historic Places
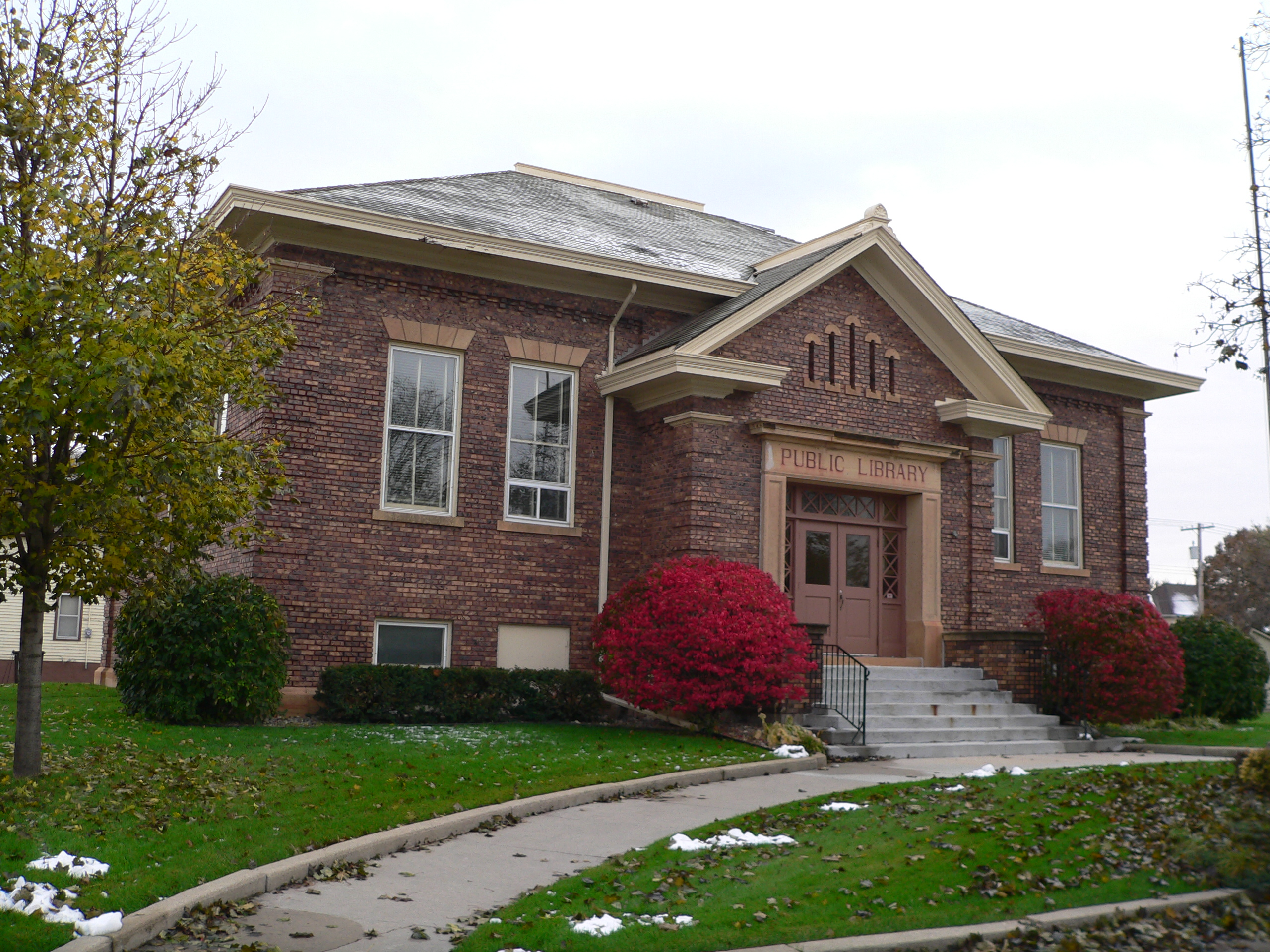
- Norfolk Carnegie Library in 2009
- Location: 803 W. Norfolk Ave., Norfolk, Nebraska, U.S.
- Coordinates: 42.0325°N 97.417778°W
- Area: less than one acre
- Built: 1910
- Built by: Woerth, L.H.
- Architect: J.C. Stitt
- Architectural style: Classical Revival
- MPS: Carnegie Libraries in Nebraska MPS
- NRHP reference No.: 98001567
- Added to NRHP: December 31, 1998

Norfolk Public Library was formed in 1906 as a subscription library by the Norfolk Women's Club. The library was originally located inside of the Bishop Block. In 1907 the Women's Club announced that it had gained funding for a new $10,000 library from Andrew Carnegie. Additionally, the library would become a free library, dropping the subscription charge. The library officially opened in November 1911.

The library's small size made it difficult to operate after 60 years. A bond issue was passed in November 1975 to build a new library. The library officially opened in July 1977. The previous library closed and was converted into an art gallery that remained until 1997. It was listed on the National Register of Historic Places on December 31, 1998. The current library underwent a major renovation, including a major addition to the North, which was completed in 2018.

== Architecture ==
It has Classical Revival details. It was designed by Norfolk architect J.C. Stitt and built by contractor L.H. Woerth. It is a one-story 60 by 44 feet (18 m × 13 m) brick building with cream sandstone trimmings. It has a raised basement and a hipped roof.
