= Miller Hall (Chadron, Nebraska) =

- U.S. National Register of Historic Places
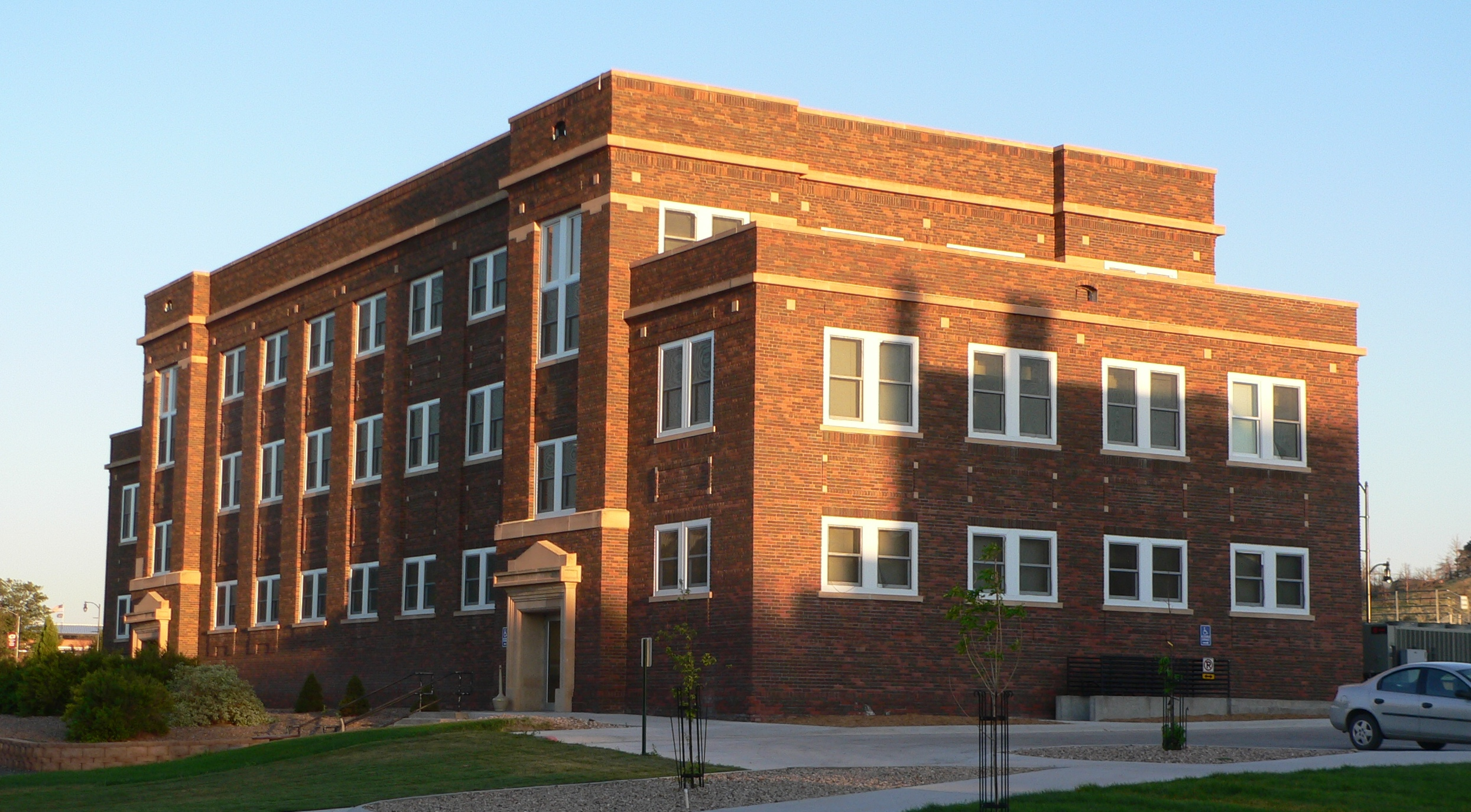

- Location within Nebraska Location within the United States
- Location: 10th and Main Sts., Chadron, Nebraska
- Coordinates: 42.864167°N 103.000833°W
- Area: less than one acre
- Built: 1920
- Architect: James C. Stitt
- MPS: Chadron State College Historic Buildings TR
- NRHP reference No.: 83001085
- Added to NRHP: September 8, 1983

Miller Hall, on the campus of Chadron State College in Chadron, Nebraska, was built in 1920 and was listed on the National Register of Historic Places in 1983.

It was designed by architect James C. Stitt. It was the first gymnasium building in western Nebraska.

It now provides academic offices, classrooms and IT for Chadron State College.
