= Rock County Courthouse (Nebraska) =

- U.S. National Register of Historic Places
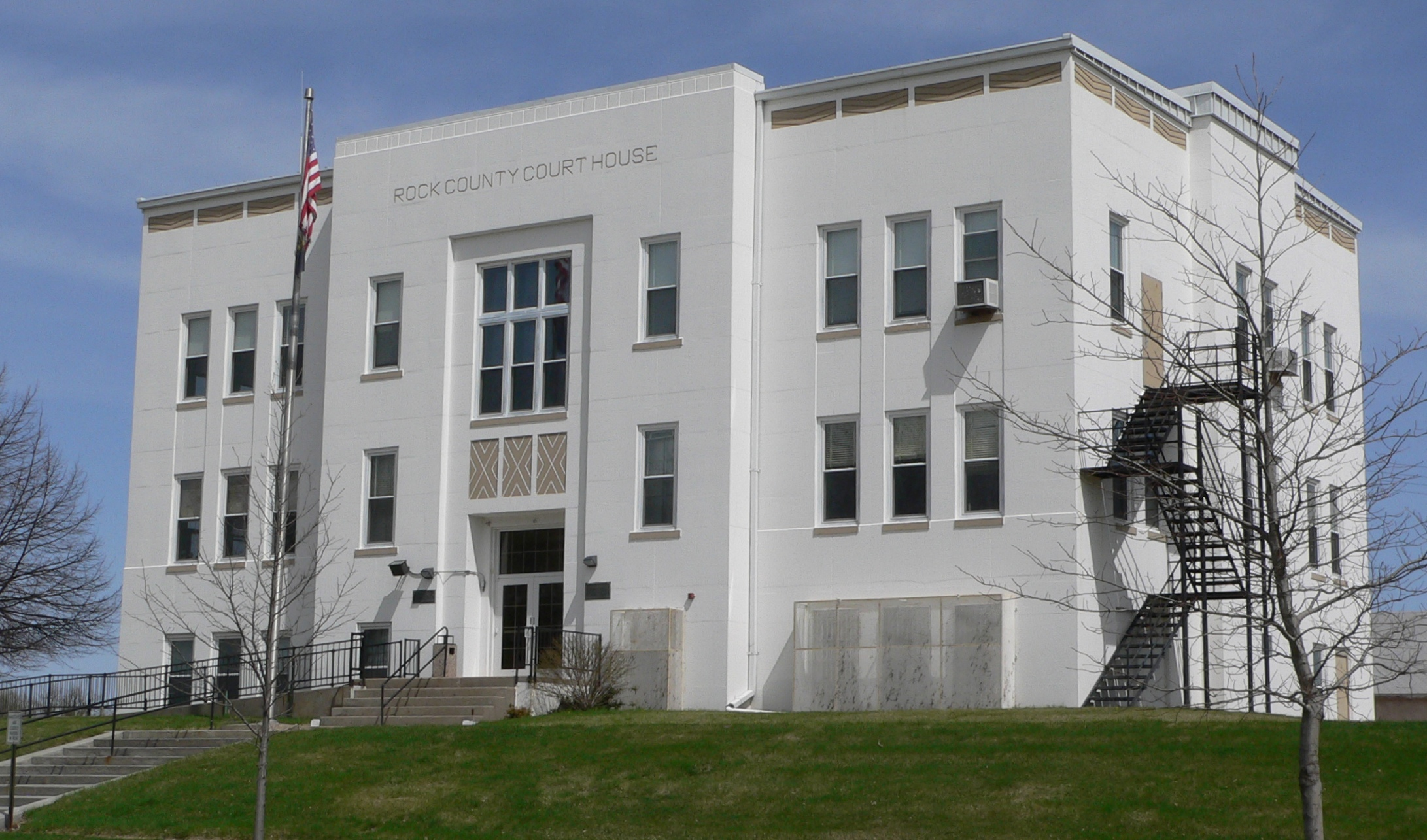

- Location within Nebraska Location within the United States
- Location: State St. between Caroline and Bertha Sts., Bassett, Nebraska
- Coordinates: 42°34′58″N 99°32′7″W
- Area: 1.7 acres (0.69 ha)
- Built: 1939
- Architect: Watson, E.B.
- Architectural style: Art Deco
- MPS: County Courthouses of Nebraska MPS
- NRHP reference No.: 90000968
- Added to NRHP: July 5, 1990

The Rock County Courthouse, located on State St. between Caroline and Bertha Sts. in Bassett, Nebraska, was built in 1939. It is an Art Deco style building designed by E.B. Watson.

It was listed on the National Register of Historic Places in 1990. The listing included two contributing buildings.

It was deemed significant for its architecture and association with politics and government in Rock County. It is one of seven Nebraska county courthouses built under federal work programs of the Great Depression. Architecturally, its NRHP nomination finds it to be "a good example of the County Citadel Property Type" and "contains design features and facilities distinctive to its design and use (such as fireproof vaults), a rectangular shape, centered entrance, Art Deco stylistic influence, and permanent materials. Elements of the design combine to convey the impression of a government building representing modernity and simplicity, also features of the County citadel."
