= Athletic Park Band Shell =

- U.S. National Register of Historic Places
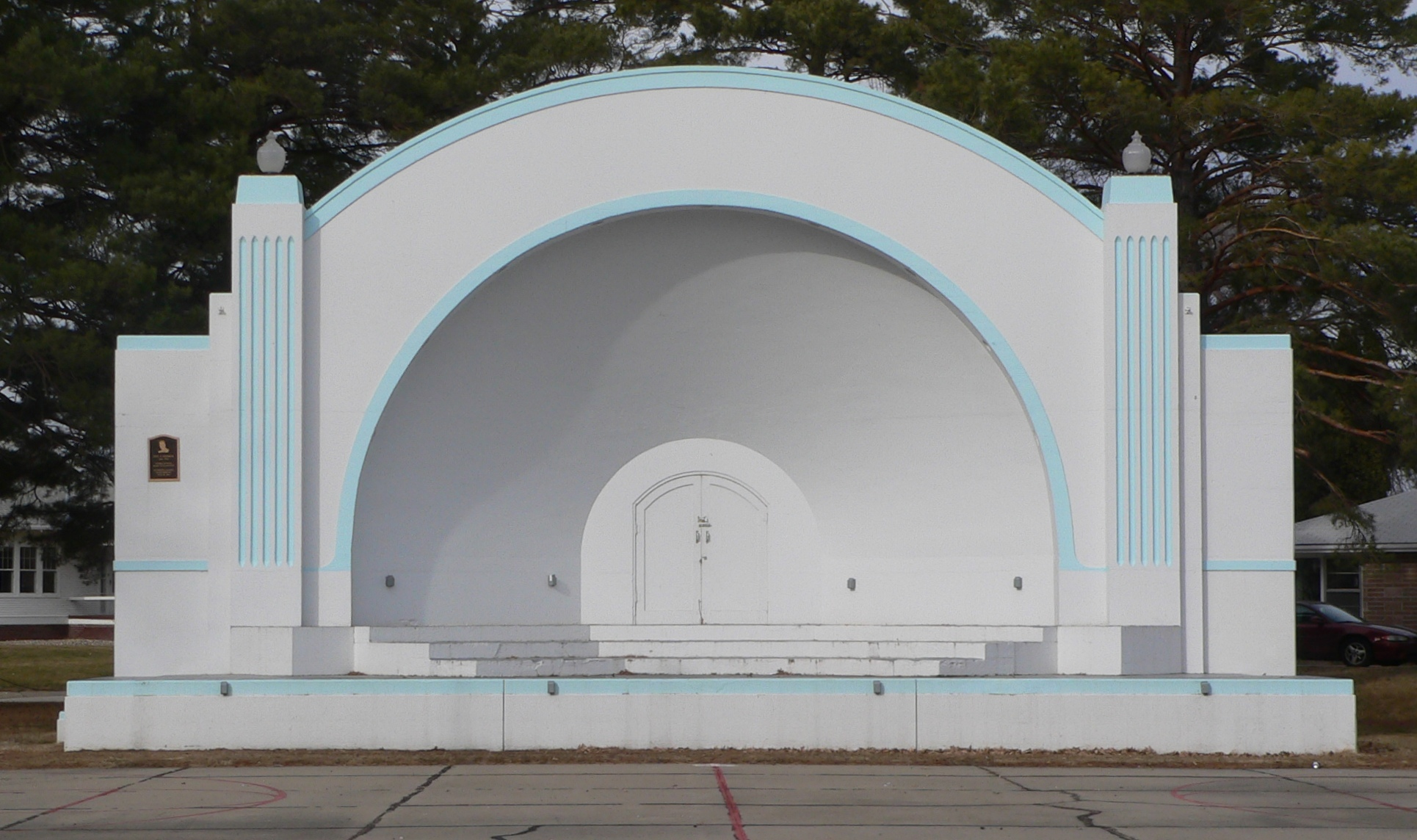
- Bandshell in 2011

- Location within Nebraska Location within the United States
- Location: Jct. of Harper and Main Sts., NW corner, Plainview, Nebraska
- Coordinates: 42.354167°N 97.792778°W
- Area: less than one acre
- Built: 1942
- Architect: Watson, Elbert B.
- Architectural style: Moderne
- NRHP reference No.: 92001573
- Added to NRHP: November 12, 1992

The Athletic Park Band Shell in Plainview, Nebraska was designed and built during 1939 to 1942. Also known as Plainview Band Shell, it was listed on the National Register of Historic Places in 1992.

The band shell is a Moderne-style structure designed by Norfolk, Nebraska architect Elbert B. Watson. The listing includes one contributing building and ten contributing objects: five concrete benches, a concrete drinking fountain, and four concrete light posts. The complex was built by the Works Progress Administration (WPA).

The band shell has a 33 feet (10 m)-diameter arch and is part of a 50 by 16 feet (15.2 m × 4.9 m) building which also includes dressing rooms. When built, it was part of a four-block park named Athletic Park, which was later divided. In 1992, it is located within a 3.26 feet (0.99 m) area known as Band Shell Park, which also includes a basketball court and playground equipment. In 1992, the band shell area was bordered by Scotch pine and elm trees that were part of the original WPA landscaping.

The Piainview Band Shell was deemed notable "on the state-wide level for its association with the WPA and as an excellent and well-preserved example of cast concrete construction executed in the moderne style." Four comparable band shells existed in Nebraska in 1992, including in Grant and Auburn, but these are not made of cast concrete and are not Moderne in style.

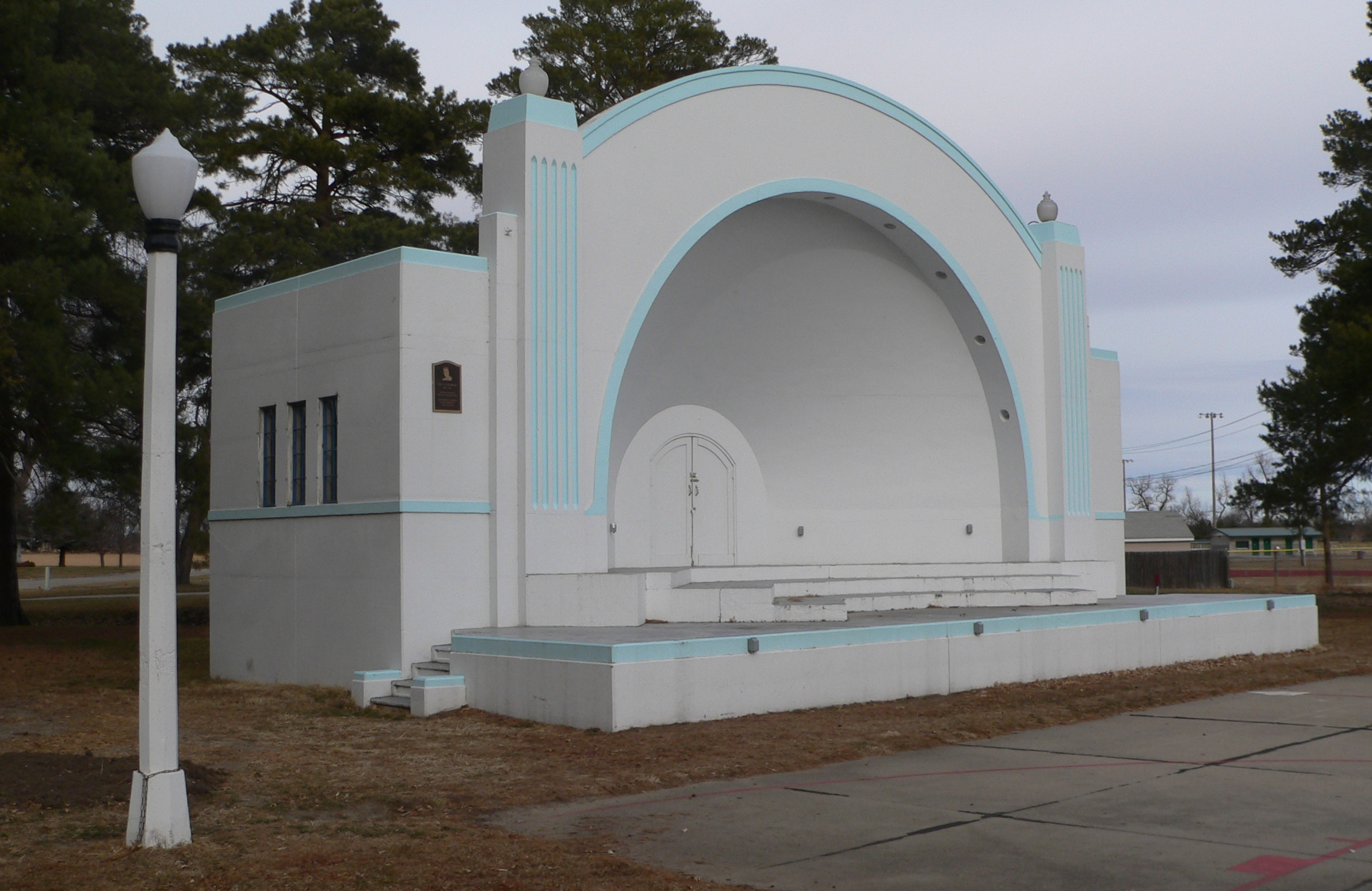
Lamp post and band shell

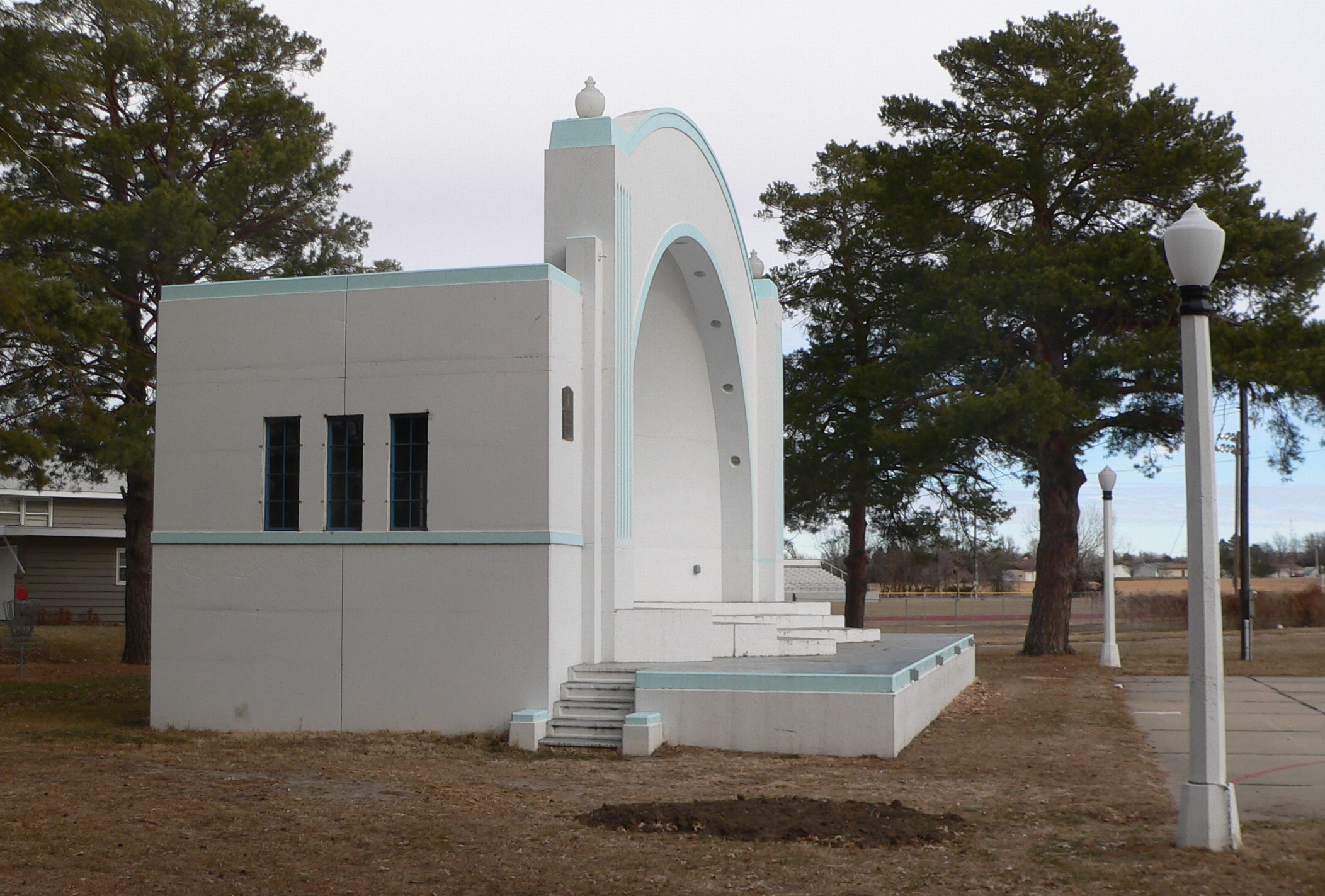
Side view

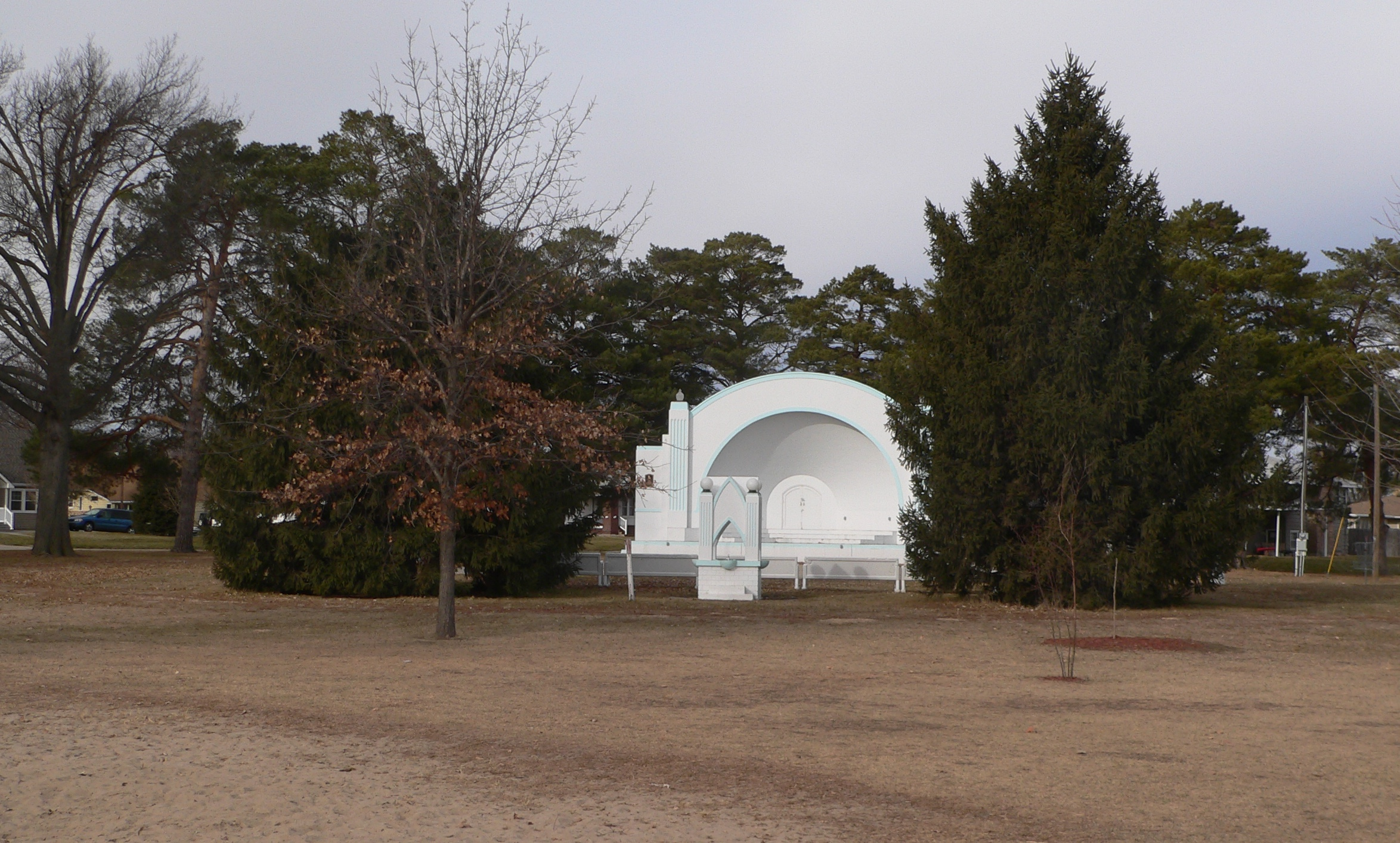
Perspective with trees

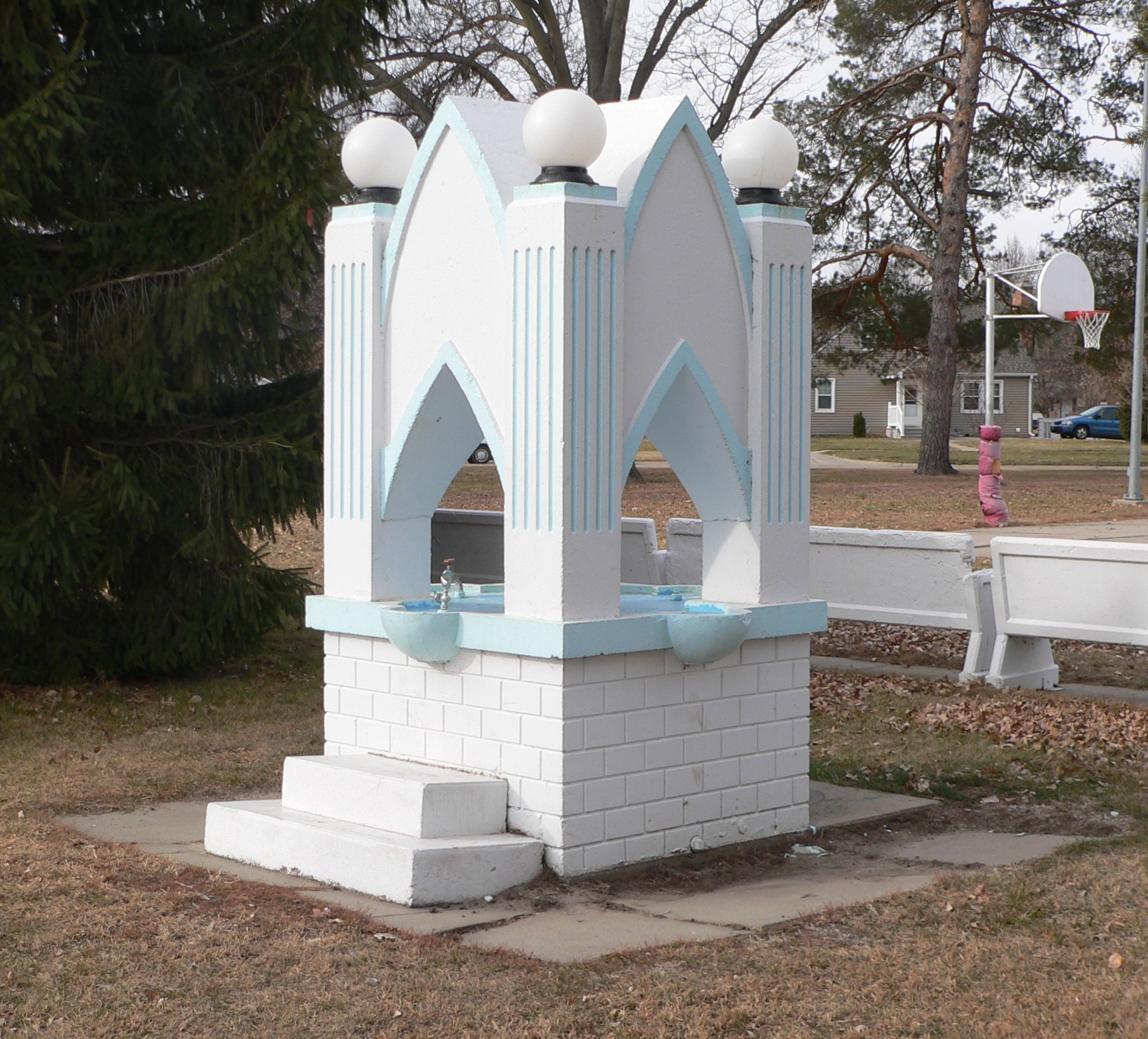
Water fountain

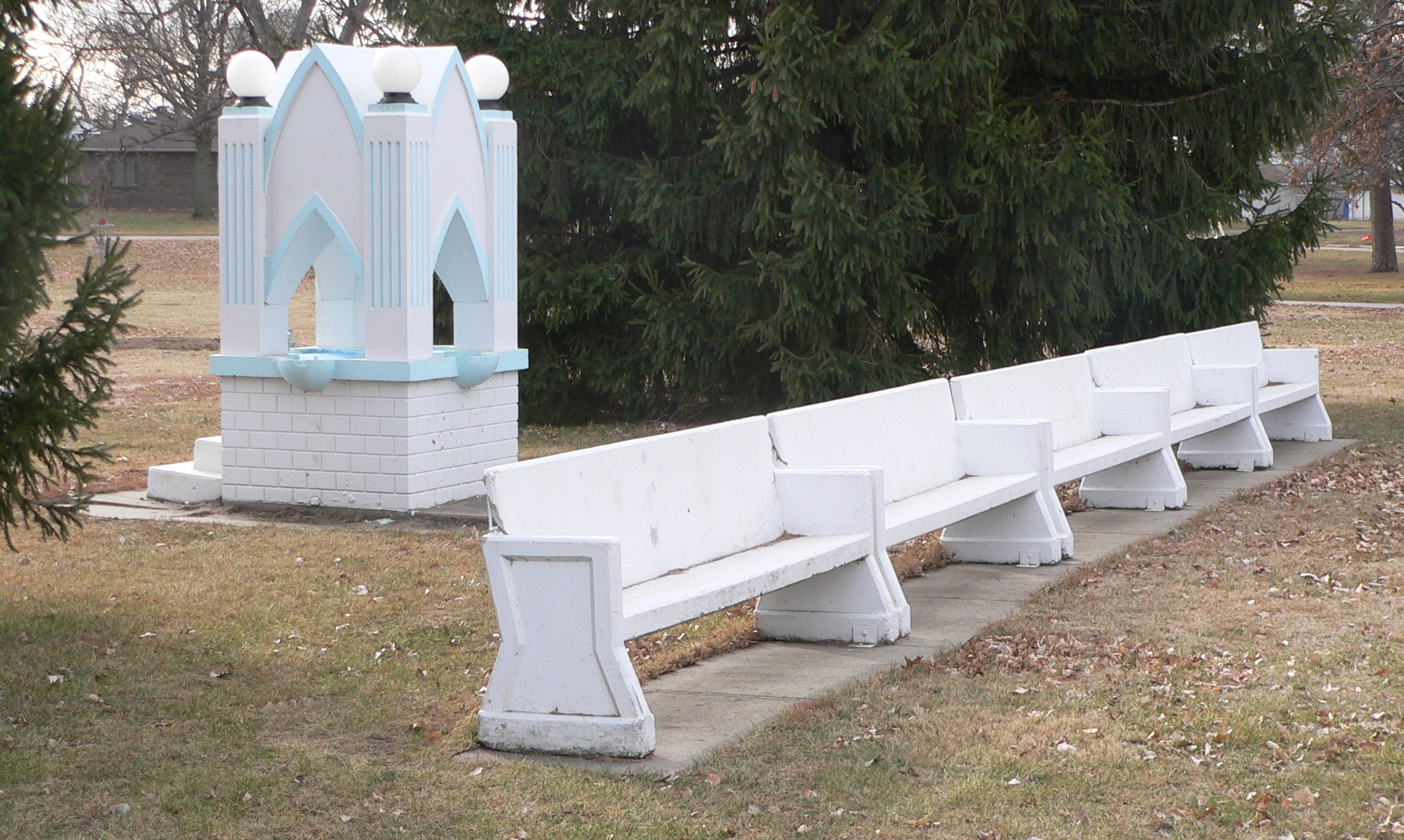
Surviving five benches

== See also ==
- Columbia Park Band Shell, Marshfield, Wisconsin, also NRHP-listed
- East Park Band Shell, Mason City, Iowa, also NRHP-listed
- Estes Park Band Shell, Iowa Falls, Iowa, also NRHP-listed
- Wolf Park Band Shell, Ellinwood, Kansas, also NRHP-listed
- Woman's Community Club Band Shell Heber Springs, Arkansas, also NRHP-listed
