= Dwight station (Nebraska) =

- Fremont, Elkhorn and Missouri Valley Railroad Depot
- U.S. National Register of Historic Places
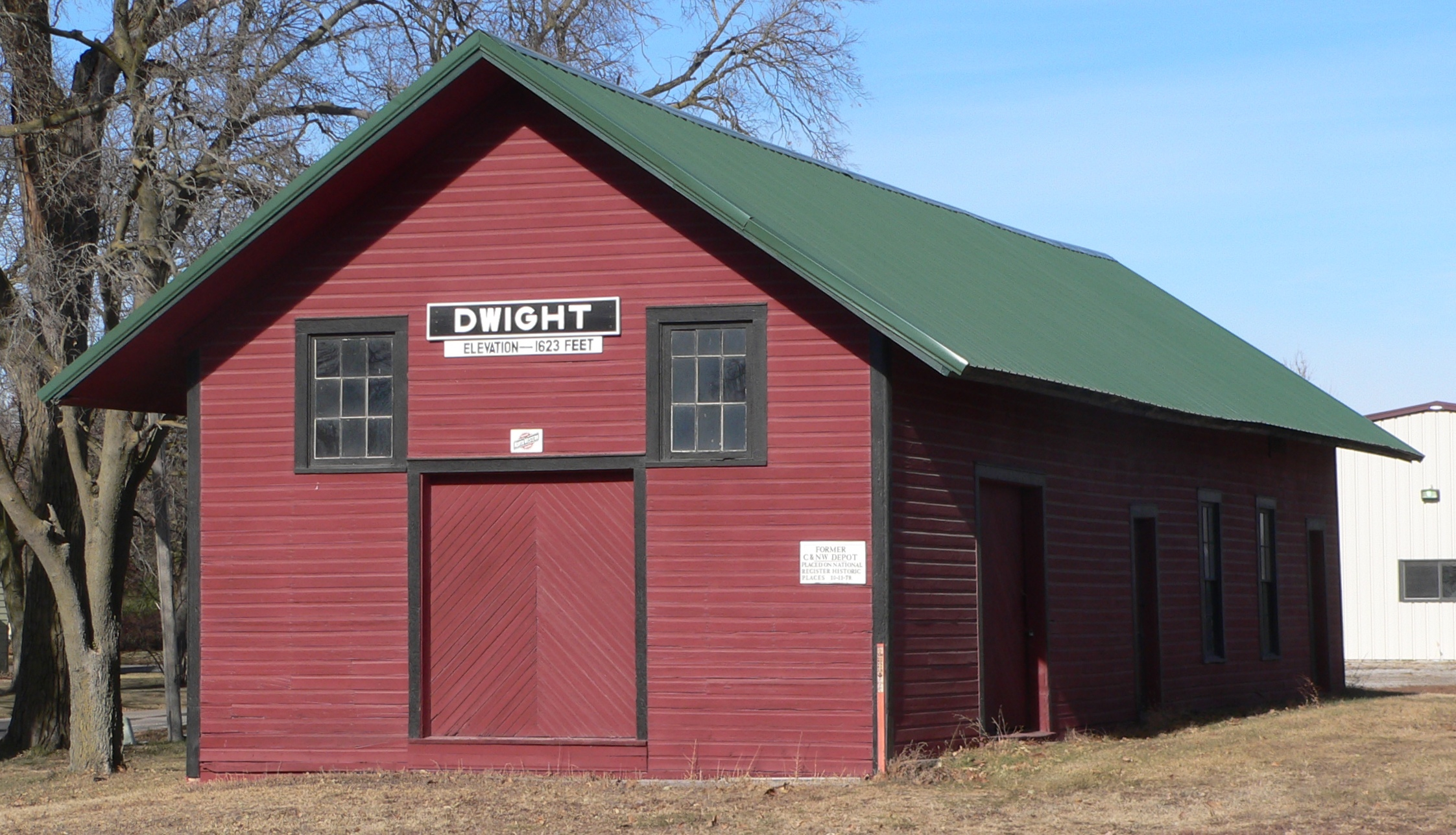

- Location within Nebraska Location within the United States
- Location: 1st and Maple Sts., Dwight, Nebraska
- Coordinates: 41°04′58″N 97°01′06″W
- Area: less than one acre
- Built: 1887
- Built by: Fremont, Elkhorn & Missouri Valley RR
- NRHP reference No.: 79003682
- Added to NRHP: October 11, 1979

The Fremont, Elkhorn & Missouri Valley Railroad Depot in Dwight, Nebraska was built in 1887 as a railroad depot of the Fremont, Elkhorn & Missouri Valley Railroad. It was later a Chicago & Northwestern Railroad (C & N W) depot. It was listed on the National Register of Historic Places in 1979.

It is a one-and-a-half-story 22 by 61 feet (6.7 m × 18.6 m) wood-frame structure, partitioned in a normal way for country railroad stations: the south end has a combination baggage-freight room, a business office including an agent's work area and a passenger waiting area is in the middle, and the north end was living quarters for the depot agent.

It has not been used as a train station since 1962, when the C & N W branchline from Platte River Junction, Nebraska, to Seward, Nebraska, was dismantled in 1962.

Preceding station	Chicago and North Western Railway	Following station
Bee toward Superior	Superior – Fremont	Brainard toward Fremont
