= Knox County Courthouse (Nebraska) =

- U.S. National Register of Historic Places
- U.S. Historic district
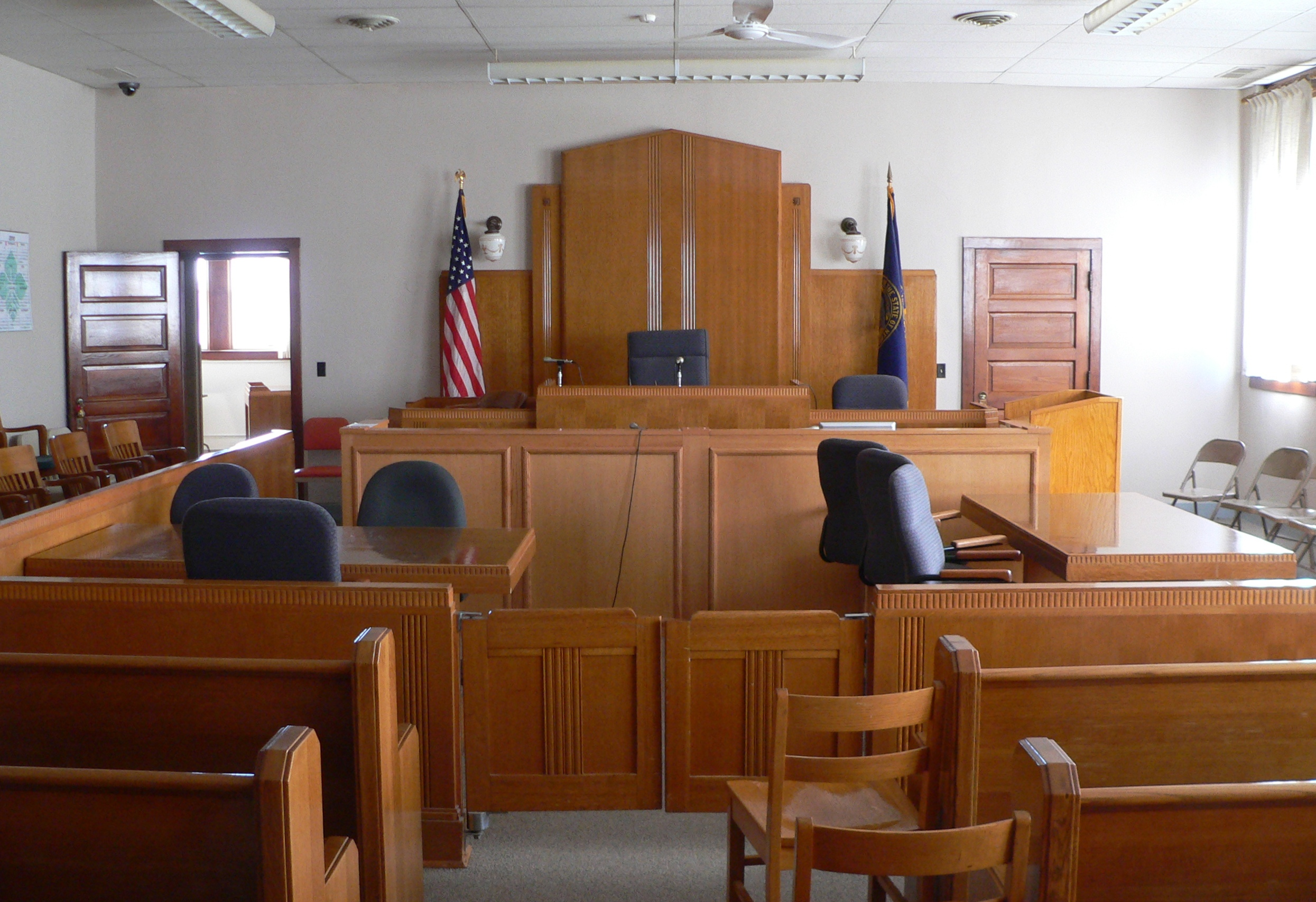
- Courtroom on second floor of courthouse

- Location within Nebraska Location within the United States
- Location: Main St. between Brazile and Bridge Sts. Center, Nebraska
- Coordinates: 42°36′32″N 97°52′37″W
- Architect: E.B. Watson
- Architectural style: Modern Movement
- MPS: County Courthouses of Nebraska MPS
- NRHP reference No.: 90000972

The Knox County Courthouse is a historic building in Center, Nebraska, the county seat of Knox County.

After a series of five elections to determine a county seat, Center — located on two corn fields in the geographic center of the county — was selected in 1901 as the county seat. The first courthouse was built in 1902. The current courthouse was constructed from February to October 1934. In addition to $50,000 raised by the county from tax levies, the courthouse was the first public building in Nebraska to be built using funds and workers from the Civil Works Administration and Federal Emergency Relief Administration.

On July 5, 1990, the Courthouse was added to the National Register of Historic Places.
