= Plainview, Nebraska =

- City
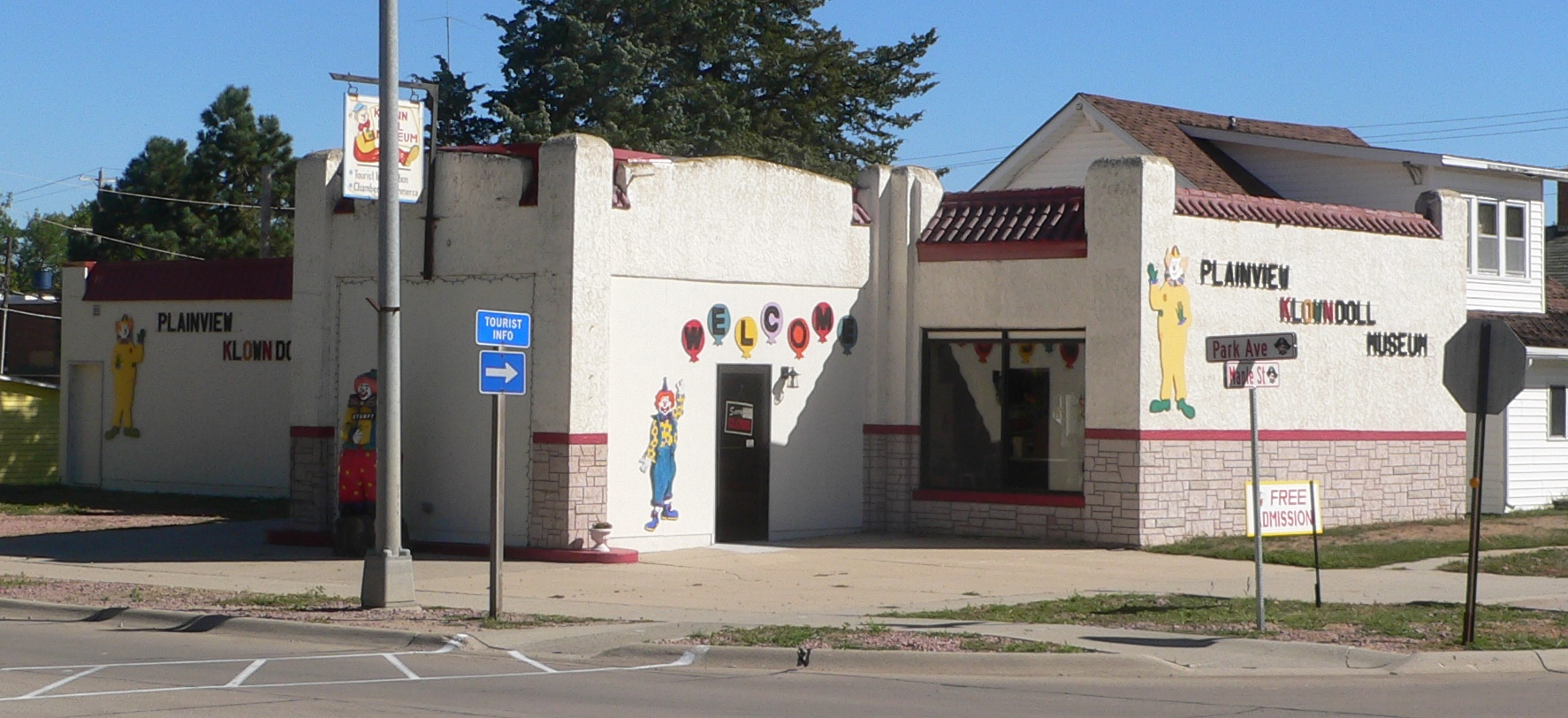
- Plainview Klown Doll Museum

- Location of Plainview, Nebraska
- Coordinates: 42°21′12″N 97°47′14″W
- Country: United States
- State: Nebraska
- County: Pierce

Government
  - Mayor: Bob Smith

Area
  - Total: 1.08 sq mi (2.80 km^{2})
  - Land: 1.08 sq mi (2.80 km^{2})
  - Water: 0 sq mi (0.00 km^{2})
- Elevation: 1,686 ft (514 m)

Population (2020)
  - Total: 1,282
  - Density: 1,184.6/sq mi (457.36/km^{2})
- Time zone: UTC-6 (Central (CST))
  - Summer (DST): UTC-5 (CDT)
- ZIP code: 68769
- Area code: 402
- FIPS code: 31-39170
- GNIS feature ID: 2396221
- Website: www.cityofplainviewne.com

Plainview is a city in Pierce County, Nebraska, United States. It is part of the Norfolk, Nebraska Micropolitan Statistical Area. The population was 1,282 at the 2020 census.

== History ==
The area of Plainview was first settled by William B. Chilvers around 1871. A year later in 1872, the first post office was established. The township was named Roseville after the first Postmaster, Charles Rose. In 1874, after Christian Lerum made a suggestion, the area and the post office were renamed to Plainview. The town of Plainview was incorporated and officially became Plainview Township in April 1886.

Plainview was platted in 1880 when the railroad was extended to that point. It took its name after Plainview, Minnesota, and from the scenic landscapes of the surrounding plains.

When Plainview was platted in 1880, there were roughly 80 settlers, two churches (one Methodist and one Congregational), one doctor, one drug store, two blacksmiths, two general stores, one hotel, and two agricultural implement dealers. The first school was made out of sod and was organized in 1872. The Bank of Plainview was the first bank in Plainview and was organized in 1884.

== Geography ==
According to the United States Census Bureau, the city has a total area of 1.08 square miles (2.80 km^{2}), all land.

== Points of interest ==
Plainview promotes itself as the "Klown Kapital" of the world, boasting a Klown Festival every June and a Klown Doll Museum with more than 4,500 pieces on display.

Plainview has three structures on the National Register of Historic Places: the Foy George Memorial Band Shell; the Fremont, Elkhorn and Missouri Valley Railroad depot, now serving as the Plainview Historical Museum; and the Carnegie library, still in use as such. The site of Plainview's first sod house is on city land; the city also has two Sears Catalog homes.

The Plainview News is the city's only newspaper.

Plainview is served by an independent telephone company, and has state-of-the-art fiber optics throughout the city. Plainview holds the distinction of being the first city in Nebraska with fiber-optic lines for every resident and business.

The city council is a four-person council with a mayor position. Council members serve four-year terms, with a rotating schedule of term limits. The mayor also recently appointed a city administrator.

Plainview was used as the fictional "Hawthorne" where much of the 2013 film Nebraska takes place.

A volunteer fire department and EMS serves Plainview.

== Demographics ==
Historical population
Census	Pop.	Note	%±
1890	375		—
1900	603		60.8%
1910	941		56.1%
1920	1,199		27.4%
1930	1,216		1.4%
1940	1,411		16.0%
1950	1,427		1.1%
1960	1,467		2.8%
1970	1,494		1.8%
1980	1,483		−0.7%
1990	1,333		−10.1%
2000	1,353		1.5%
2010	1,246		−7.9%
2020	1,282		2.9%
U.S. Decennial Census

=== 2010 census ===
At the 2010 census there were 1,246 people in 562 households, including 334 families, in the city. The population density was 1,153.7 inhabitants per square mile (445.4/km^{2}). There were 656 housing units at an average density of 607.4 per square mile (234.5/km^{2}). The racial makeup of the city was 98.2% White, 0.3% African American, 0.2% Native American, 0.2% Asian, 0.6% from other races, and 0.6% from two or more races. Hispanic or Latino people of any race were 1.3%.

Of the 562 households 24.0% had children under the age of 18 living with them, 49.5% were married couples living together, 6.9% had a female householder with no husband present, 3.0% had a male householder with no wife present, and 40.6% were non-families. 36.7% of households were one person and 19.4% were one person aged 65 or older. The average household size was 2.16 and the average family size was 2.79.

The median age was 46.7 years. 21.7% of residents were under the age of 18; 5.4% were between the ages of 18 and 24; 21.2% were from 25 to 44; 26.4% were from 45 to 64; and 25.4% were 65 or older. The gender makeup of the city was 48.4% male and 51.6% female.

=== 2000 census ===
At the 2000 census there were 1,353 people in 588 households, including 362 families, in the city. The population density was 1,249.1 inhabitants per square mile (482.3/km^{2}). There were 656 housing units at an average density of 605.6 per square mile (233.8/km^{2}). The racial makeup of the city was 97.71% White, 0.15% African American, 1.03% Native American, 0.44% Asian, and 0.67% from two or more races. Hispanic or Latino people of any race were 0.37%.

Of the 588 households 27.0% had children under the age of 18 living with them, 53.4% were married couples living together, 6.3% had a female householder with no husband present, and 38.3% were non-families. 36.6% of households were one person and 22.4% were one person aged 65 or older. The average household size was 2.22 and the average family size was 2.92.

The age distribution was 23.4% under the age of 18, 6.0% from 18 to 24, 22.1% from 25 to 44, 20.4% from 45 to 64, and 28.1% 65 or older. The median age was 43 years. For every 100 females, there were 86.4 males. For every 100 females age 18 and over, there were 78.0 males.

The median household income was $27,056, and the median family income was $35,625. Males had a median income of $28,516 versus $21,979 for females. The per capita income for the city was $15,814. About 8.0% of families and 13.4% of the population were below the poverty line, including 15.7% of those under age 18 and 15.4% of those age 65 or over.

== Notable people ==
- Vern Hoscheit (1922–2007), minor league baseball player and major league coach
- Arthur L. Miller (1892–1967), U.S. representative from Nebraska
- Ben Sasse (born 1972), U.S. senator from Nebraska and president of Midland University and the University of Florida
- Del Shankel (1927–2018), Chancellor Emeritus of the University of Kansas
