= Natick (disambiguation) =

Natick is a town in Massachusetts, established on the site of the Natick Praying Town founded in 1651.

Natick may also refer to:

== Indigenous community ==
- Natick language, another name for the Massachusett language
- Praying Indians of Natick, 17th-century Native American Christian converts who settled in the Natick Praying Town

== Towns ==
- Natick, Nebraska
- East Natick, Rhode Island

== Ships ==
- USS Agawam (SP-570), was renamed USS Natick (SP-570) in 1917
- Natick (YTB-760), a tugboat acquired by the U.S. Navy in 1961
- Natick-class tugboat, a class of harbor tugboats that have been active since the 1960s

== Other ==
- Natick Center Historic District, center of Natick, Massachusetts
- Natick Center station, train station in Natick, Massachusetts
- Natick High School, high school in Natick, Massachusetts
- Natick Mall, mall in Natick, Massachusetts
- Natick principle, crossword puzzle term coined by Rex Parker
- Praying Indians of Natick and Ponkapoag, a nonprofit organization of people claiming descendency from the 17th-century Praying Indians of Natick and Ponkapoag
- Project Natick, experimental undersea data center by Microsoft
