= List of National Recreation Trails in Nebraska =

The following are National Recreation Trails in Nebraska, United States.

Trail name	Near	Location
Fontenelle Forest	Bellevue	Fontenelle Forest Nature Center
Scott Lookout	Halsey	Nebraska National Forest
Wilderness Park	Lincoln	Lincoln
Cowboy Recreation and Nature Trail	Norfolk	Nebraska Game and Parks Commission
Trooper Trail	Chadron	Nebraska National Forest
Meadowlark Trail	Ft. Calhoun	United States Fish and Wildlife Service
