= Pine Ridge National Recreation Area =

Protected area in Nebraska, United States

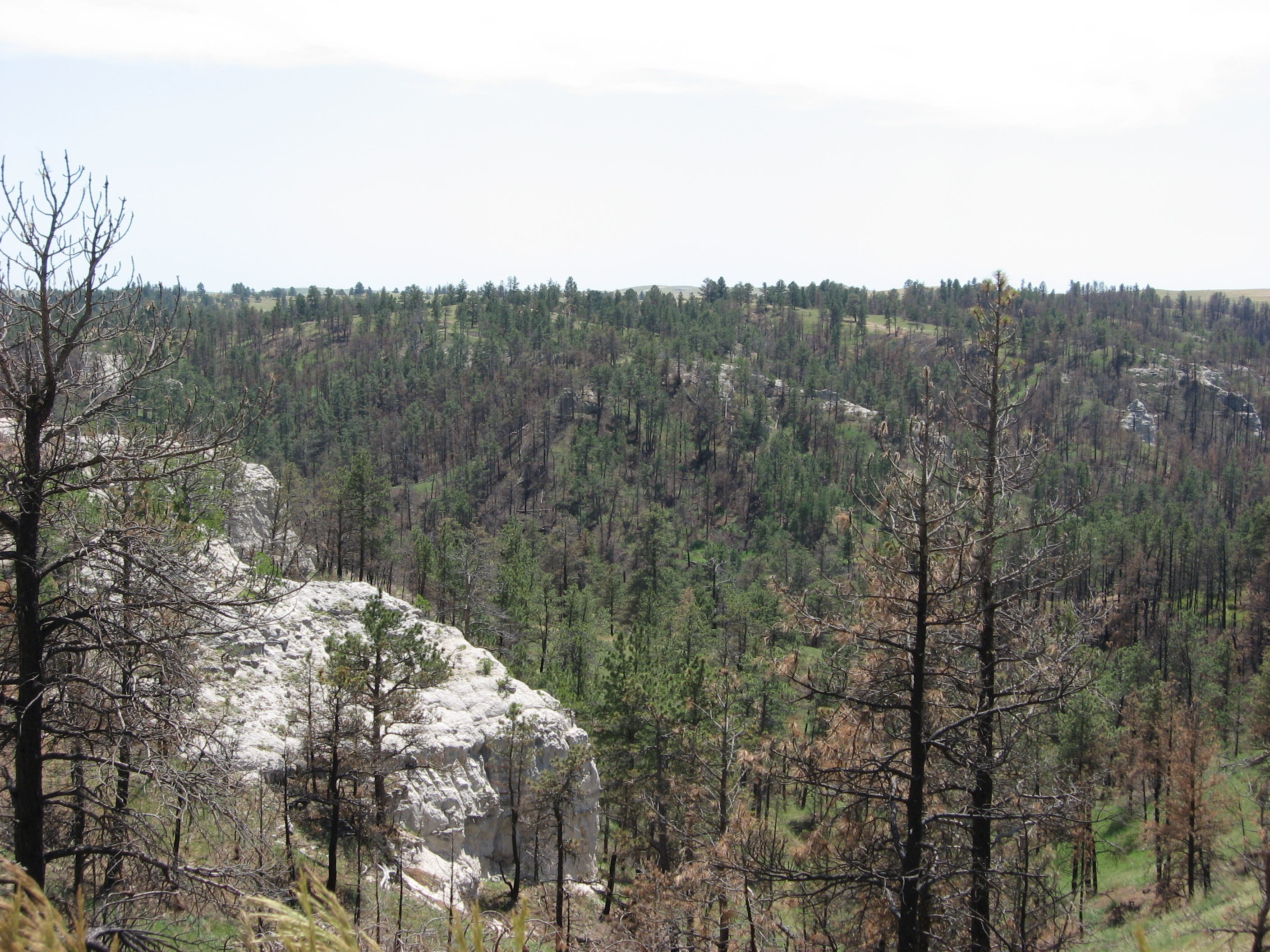
- Forested Hills in Pine Ridge NRA

- Location within the United States Location within Nebraska
- Location: Dawes County, Nebraska, United States
- Nearest city: Chadron, Nebraska
- Coordinates: 42°37′40″N 103°07′42″W
- Area: 6,600 acres (2,700 ha)
- Governing body: United States Forest Service
- Website: Pine Ridge Ranger District/Pine Ridge National Recreation Area

The Pine Ridge National Recreation Area is a United States national recreation area in the Pine Ridge region of northwestern Nebraska. The recreation area is managed by the Pine Ridge Ranger District of the Nebraska National Forest.

It is home to wildlife species such as coyotes, bobcats, mountain lions, elk, white-tailed deer, mule deer, eagles, hawks, and wild turkeys.

Activities in the recreation area include hiking, horseback riding, and mountain biking. Life in the recreation area includes ponderosa pines and the animals that feed on them. The closest major town is Chadron, Nebraska.
