= Nebraska National Forest =

United States National Forest

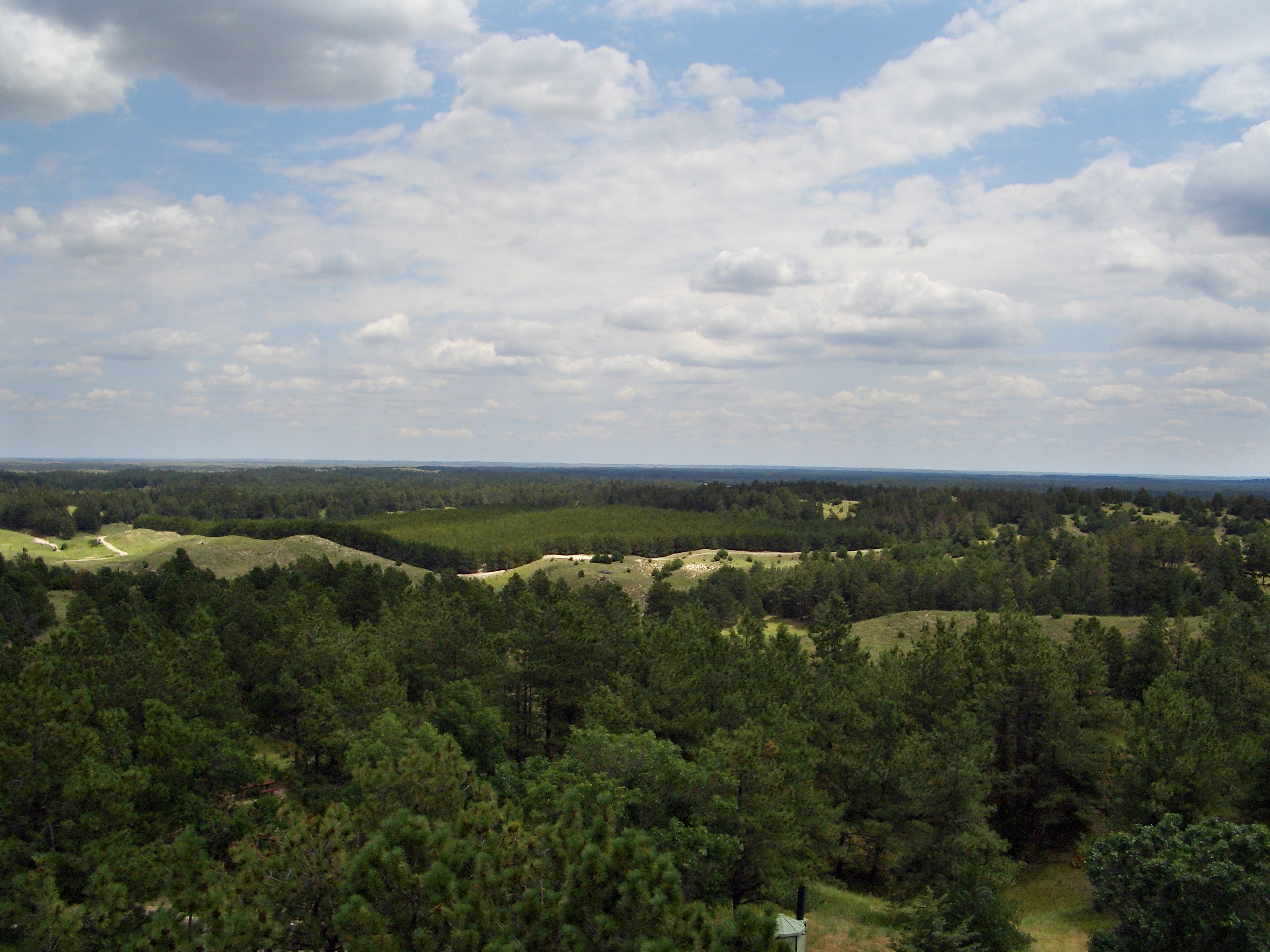
- The Bessey Ranger District near Halsey

- Location within the United States Location within Nebraska
- Location: Thomas, Dawes, Blaine, and Sioux counties, Nebraska, U.S.
- Nearest city: Chadron (Pine Ridge unit); Halsey (Bessey unit)
- Coordinates: 42°44′46″N 102°54′7″W
- Area: 141,864 acres (574.10 km^{2})
- Established: July 1, 1908; 118 years ago
- Governing body: U.S. Forest Service
- Website: Nebraska National Forest

The Nebraska National Forest is a United States national forest located in western Nebraska, with a total area of 141,864 acres (221.7 sq mi; 574.1 km^{2}). The forest is managed by the U.S. Forest Service's Nebraska Forests and Grasslands Supervisor's Office in nearby Chadron. The national forest includes two ranger districts, the Bessey Ranger District and the Pine Ridge Ranger District. In descending order of land, the forest lies in parts of Thomas, Dawes, Blaine, and Sioux counties.

== History ==
The Nebraska National Forests & Grasslands began in 1902 as an experiment. University of Nebraska botany professor Charles Edwin Bessey, with the assistance of Gifford Pinchot, first Forest Service Chief, convinced President Theodore Roosevelt to set aside two treeless tracts of Nebraska sandhills as "forest reserves." Bessey's intent was to grow trees, which would offset what some thought would be a national timber shortage from large fires, unregulated harvest, and the country's growing appetite for wood products.

Nebraska National Forest was established on November 15, 1907, by the consolidation of three smaller forests: Dismal River, Niobrara and North Platte National Forests. The Niobrara district is now known as the Samuel R. McKelvie National Forest.

The national grasslands and the native ponderosa pine forest of Nebraska's Pine Ridge area were added to the National Forest System in the 1950s. The nearly 1.1 million acres (1,700 mi^{2}; 4,500 km^{2}) administered by the Nebraska National Forests & Grasslands are scattered across a large arc extending from central Nebraska west to the northern Panhandle, into southwestern South Dakota and on east to the state's center. At one point it was the largest man-made forest in the world, but has been surpassed by a forest in China.

== Bessey Ranger District ==
The 90,000-acre (140.6 sq mi; 364.2 km^{2}) Bessey Ranger District is in the Sandhills of central Nebraska. Encompassing about 63.9% of the forest's total area, it lies in parts of Thomas and Blaine counties. It was established in 1902 by Charles E. Bessey because he believed the area to have once had a natural forest and as an experiment to see if forests could be recreated in treeless areas of the Great Plains for use as a national timber reserve. This effort resulted in a 20,000-acre (31.3 sq mi; 80.9 km^{2}) forest, the largest human-planted forest in the United States. Today the forest's nursery supplies 2.5 to 3 million seedlings per year. The Bessey Tree Nursery is listed on the National Register of Historic Places. There is a local ranger district office in Halsey.

=== Biodiversity of the Bessey District ===
The presence of the artificial forest in the Great Plains has allowed multiple species to colonize the area, including birds such as red-breasted nuthatch Sitta canadensis and the pine siskin Spinus pinus.

== Pine Ridge Ranger District ==
The 52,000-acre (81.3 sq mi; 210.4 km^{2}) Pine Ridge Ranger District is in the Pine Ridge region of northwest Nebraska. It contains about 36.1% of the forest's total area, and it lies in part of Dawes and Sioux counties. The native ponderosa forests were added to the National Forest system in the 1950s. The Soldier Creek Wilderness, a federally designated wilderness area, is in the forest.

The 6,600-acre (10.3 sq mi; 27 km^{2}) Pine Ridge National Recreation Area is located within the ranger district.

== Management and additional lands ==
The Nebraska National Forest is managed by the Nebraska National Forests and Grasslands Supervisor's Office in Chadron. Additionally, this office manages the following public lands:

- Samuel R. McKelvie National Forest
- Buffalo Gap National Grassland
- Fort Pierre National Grassland
- Oglala National Grassland
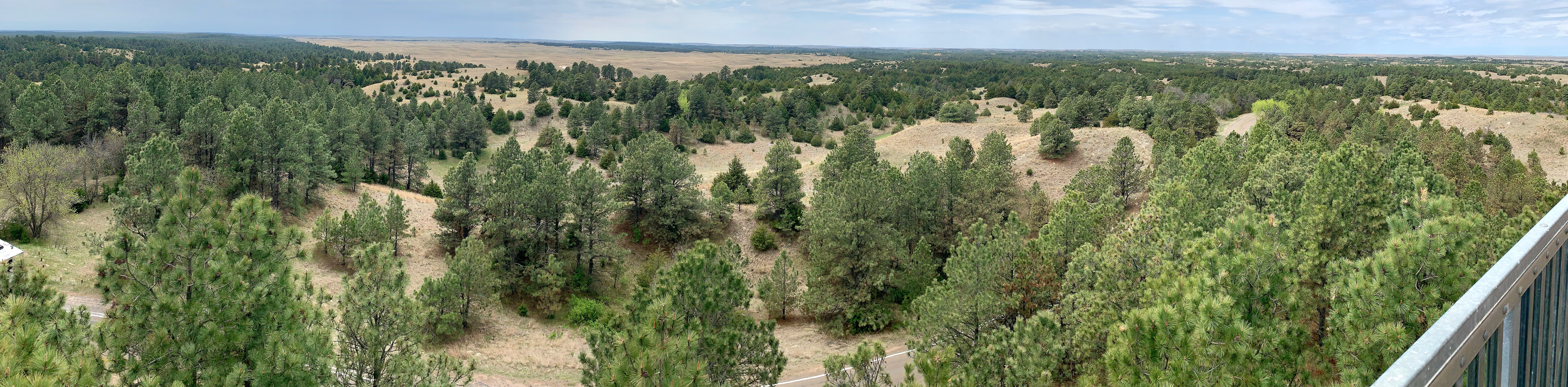
Nebraska National Forest west of Halsey

== See also ==
- List of national forests of the United States
- Chadron State Park
- Fort Robinson State Park
