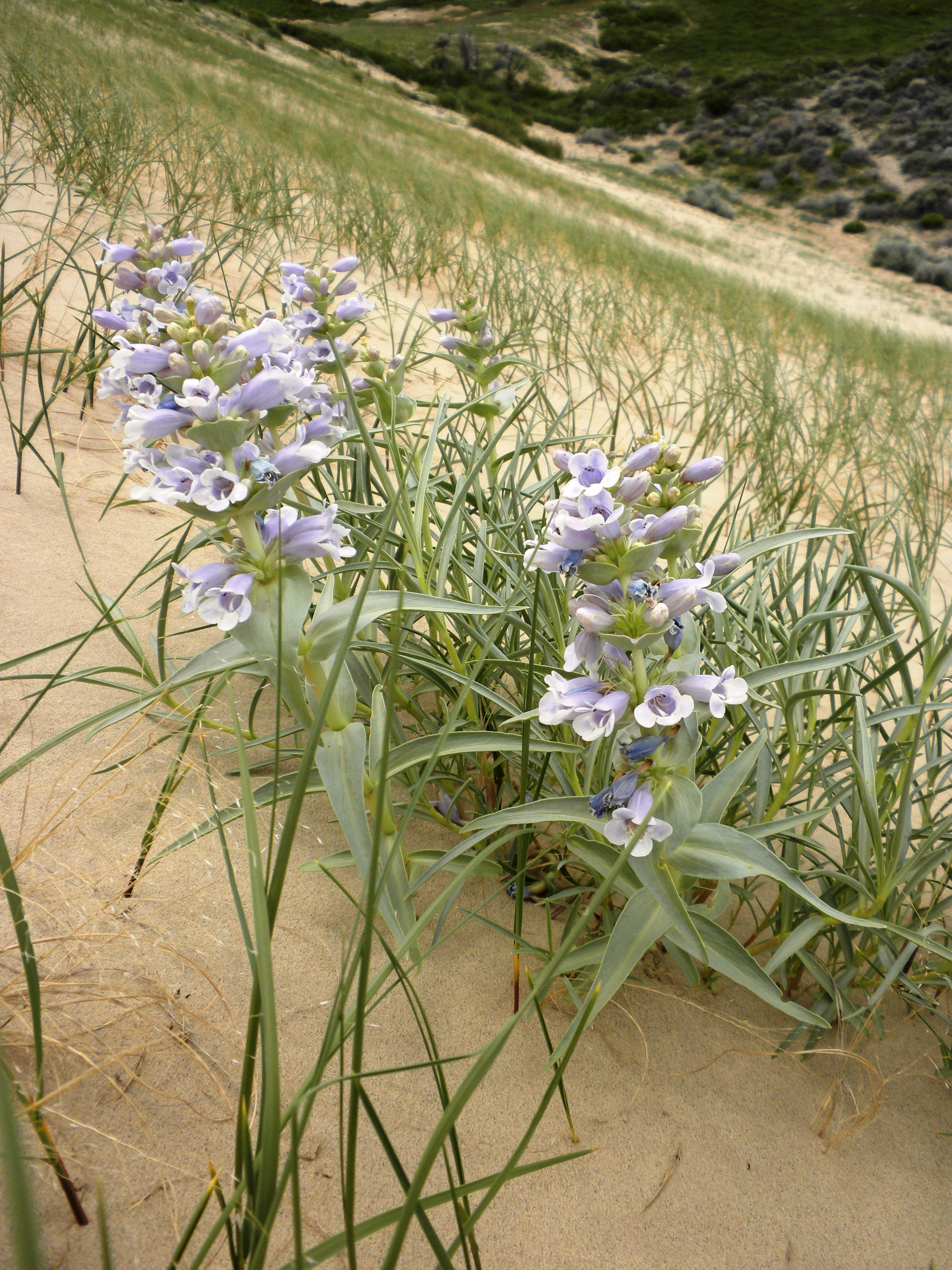
- Bradley Peak, Carbon County, Wyoming

Conservation status
- Endangered (ESA)

Scientific classification
- Kingdom: Plantae
- Clade: Tracheophytes
- Clade: Angiosperms
- Clade: Eudicots
- Clade: Asterids
- Order: Lamiales
- Family: Plantaginaceae
- Genus: Penstemon
- Species: P. haydenii

Binomial name
- Penstemon haydenii S. Watson

= Penstemon haydenii =

Species of flowering plant

Penstemon haydenii, the blowout penstemon or blowout beardtongue, is a species of flowering plant in the genus Penstemon and the family Plantaginaceae. The warm-season perennial is native to nine counties in the Nebraska Sand Hills and a single location in Carbon County, Wyoming. The plant has a milky blue color with a waxy cuticle, pale purple leaves, and an alternating leaf pattern with one central stalk. The flowers, while in the inflorescence stage, originate from the bases of the leaves of the plant. Blowout penstemon flowers from May until early June and drops its seeds from late August into September.

P. haydenii grows on bare sand dunes. It is resistant to the abrasive forces of the blowing sands due to its incorporation of a protective thick waxy cuticle. Other plants are often cut down by the scouring sands as they sprout.

Another adaptive feature for the blowout penstemon is the lifespan of the seeds. The seeds dropped in late summer can remain viable in a seedbank buried in the sandy soils for decades. Prolonged wet conditions and abrasion are required for breaking dormancy and for seed germination. The plant is primarily an out-crosser, although studies show that it is potentially self-fertile.

== Distribution and habitat ==
Blowout penstemon was only known from the Sandhills of western Nebraska until the recent discovery of limited populations in Wyoming. It is found exclusively in sandy locations with little to no vegetation present, such as blowouts, hence its name. Due to the uncompetitive nature of the plant it is easily outcompeted by other plants in the succession scheme. The ever-shifting sandy soils of the Sandhills provide blowout penstemon with an ideal environment, since there is little to no competition for water, nutrients, and sunlight. The plant colonises such areas as a pioneer species and thus promotes ecological succession.

== Conservation ==
=== Endangered status ===
Blowout penstemon was declared an endangered species on September 1, 1987, due to its small numbers and habitat limitations. The direct cause of the reduced habitat is partly due to improvement of land management practices and control of fire in the Sandhills. Prior to the changes in management practices, land owners often unintentionally created blowout conditions with incorrect implementation of livestock grazing densities, essentially by overstocking. In addition, there was no consistent blowout control protocol. Current management practices often follow a more concise grazing scheme that promotes the improvement of range conditions and the reduction of habitat loss for blowout penstemon.

Diminished wildfire regimes in the Sandhills have also had detrimental effects on habitat for blowout penstemon. Fire acts as a means for removing debris and litter from the soil surface, opening up the bare soil to wind erosion. This increase in wind erosion causes growing conditions for other plants to be more unfavorable, reducing competition from other species to the advantage of blowout penstemon.

As artificial control of wildfires becomes more widespread, it promotes the development of the dunes to rangeland and thereby the elimination of blowout sites. Fire in the Sandhills has been more extensively controlled because of its detrimental effects. With the technology and resources available it is also easier to control and contain wildfires that may naturally occur.

=== Major threats ===
Blowout penstemon has four known threats that suppress numbers and available habitat. One of the first being human intervention, as is the major cause of many species to become endangered and extinct. Another is caused by the climatic conditions, unfavorable growing conditions. Plant competition and insect damage are also contributing factors in the endangerment of the blowout penstemon.

The improvement of land management practices and control of fire is a direct human influence on the habitat conditions needed for the growth and development of blowout penstemon populations. In addition to these management plans, land managers may also reshape the blowouts with machinery to reduce the swirling action of winds. There are several common ways of leveling off the sharp edges of the blowouts. Mechanical means are often used to reshape the blowouts. Cattle are used to reshape the land and provide a layer of litter and debris.

Climatic conditions have been thought to be a factor in the reduced numbers as well. Because the seeds require wet conditions to break dormancy, drought can be a factor. The lack of moisture discourages the development of the seeds and promotes prolonged dormant stage.

Plant competition is another large contribution to the reduction in numbers of the blowout penstemon plants. The penstemon provides shelter for other plants, increasing plant growth and decreasing the amount of windblown sand. The new plants then compete with the penstemon. Blowout penstemon in a blowout is one of the first signs of blowout recovery; to a land manager this is a positive sign for increased range condition and increased productivity.

Insect damage also accounts for a considerable negative influence on the plants survival ability. "The most serious insect problem is probably the larvae of the pyralid moth, which bores into the stem and root crowns of the blowout penstemon plant to pupate. This can cause a 75% mortality rate of the affected plants".

=== Recovery plans ===
Conservation activities include a form of regular surface disturbance that promotes the blowout environment and reduction of plant development. Oil and gas companies have been opened up into habitat known for blowout penstemon with strict regulations concerning surface disturbances. This intensive management is yet once again not a blanket policy; rather it is dealt with on a case by case level, depending on the year, climatic conditions, seasonal timing, and rehabilitation state of the stand.

As a type of insurance for the existence of the blowout penstemon plant, seeds have been and are currently being collected and stored in seed banks to ensure the continuation of this species and to prevent extinction from occurring. These seeds may even be used at a later date to introduce them into a new environment. Other management practices include elimination of all-terrain vehicles.
