= Pine Ridge (region) =

Escarpment in Nebraska

Coordinates: 42°45′01″N 103°00′05″W

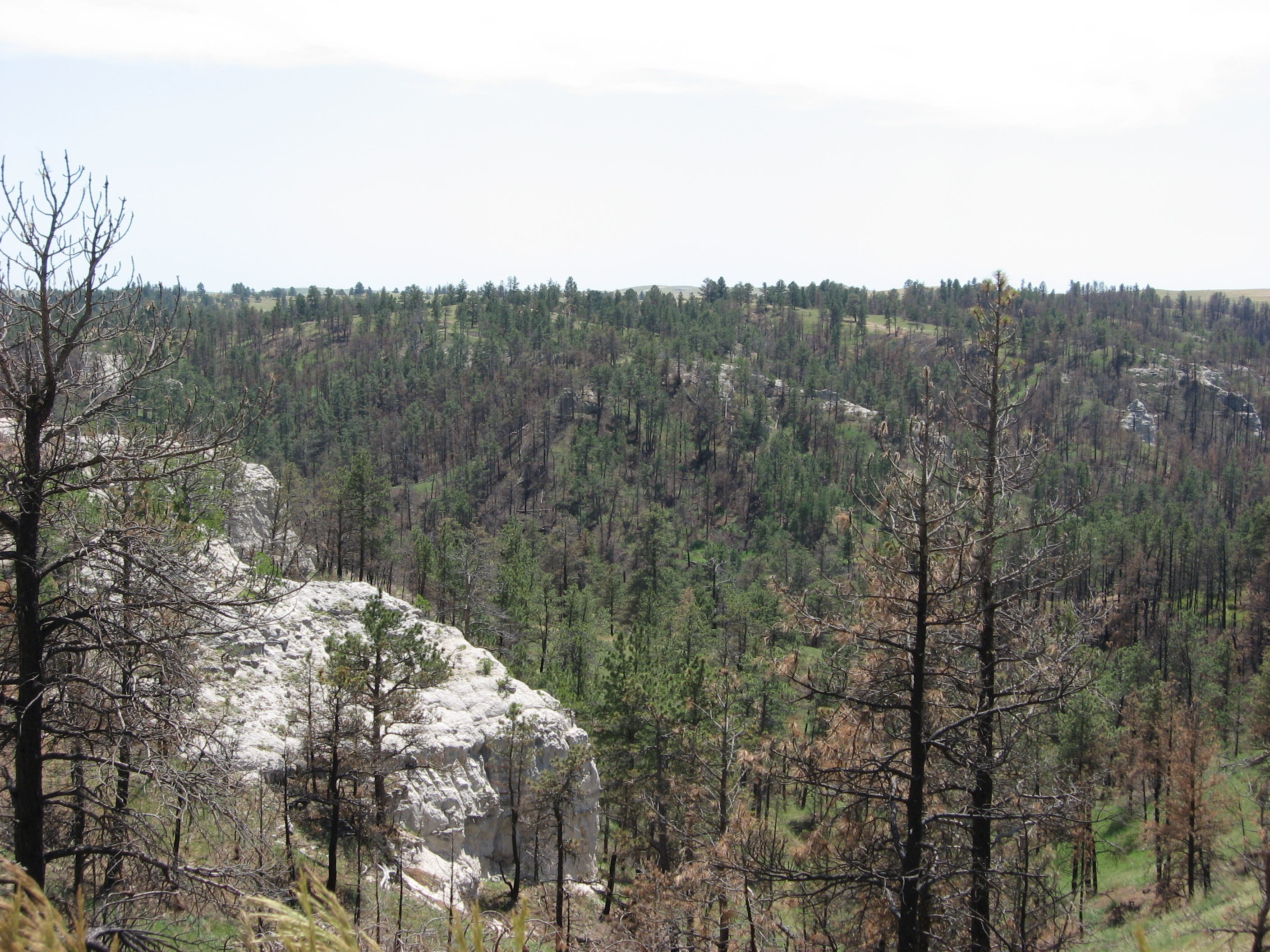
The Pine Ridge region has forested hills.

The Pine Ridge is an escarpment between the Niobrara River and the White River in far northwestern Nebraska (a small section extends into South Dakota). The high tableland between the rivers has been eroded into a region of forested buttes, ridges and canyons.

== Ecology ==
The plant and animal life in the Pine Ridge is atypical for Nebraska; the ecology is very similar to the Black Hills, 50 miles (80 km) to the north. The dominant tree in the Pine Ridge is the ponderosa pine; deciduous trees (such as cottonwoods) are also present in canyon bottoms. The Pine Ridge is one of two regions in Nebraska that support bighorn sheep; elk, river otters, mule deer, and wild turkeys are also common.

== History ==
The Pine Ridge region was the setting of the closing chapters of the Indian Wars. The region was home to several bands of Lakota; several skirmishes between the Lakota and the U.S. Army took place in the 1860s and 1870s. Crazy Horse was killed at Fort Robinson in 1877. In 1879, Dull Knife led the Cheyenne Outbreak from Fort Robinson.

== Protected areas ==
A large portion of the Pine Ridge is owned or managed by either the Nebraska Game and Parks Commission or by various U.S. Government agencies for preservation and recreation uses. These areas include:

- Chadron State Park
- Fort Robinson
- Metcalf Wildlife Management Area
- Nebraska National Forest
  - Pine Ridge National Recreation Area
  - Soldier Creek Wilderness
- Oglala National Grassland
  - Hudson-Meng Bison Kill
  - Toadstool Geologic Park
- Peterson Wildlife Management Area
- Ponderosa Wildlife Management Area

== See also ==
- Sowbelly Canyon
