= Sowbelly Canyon =

Coordinates: 42°45′29″N 103°49′24″W

Sowbelly Canyon is located in the northwestern corner of Nebraska. It is 2.7 miles (4.3 km) northeast of Harrison and is part of the Pine Ridge region.

Sowbelly Canyon is a little-known portion of the Pine Ridge. The canyon can be viewed on a scenic driving route north of Harrison; the drive is approximately 11 miles (18 km) long. A bed and breakfast in the lower bluffs and pines of the canyon was destroyed by a wildfire in July 2006.

Sowbelly Canyon was named when hungry soldiers who had been fleeing Indians were offered sowbelly (bacon) by the rescue party. Sowbelly Creek was named from the same incident.
