= Niobrara Valley Preserve =

56,000 acre conservation area in Nebraska

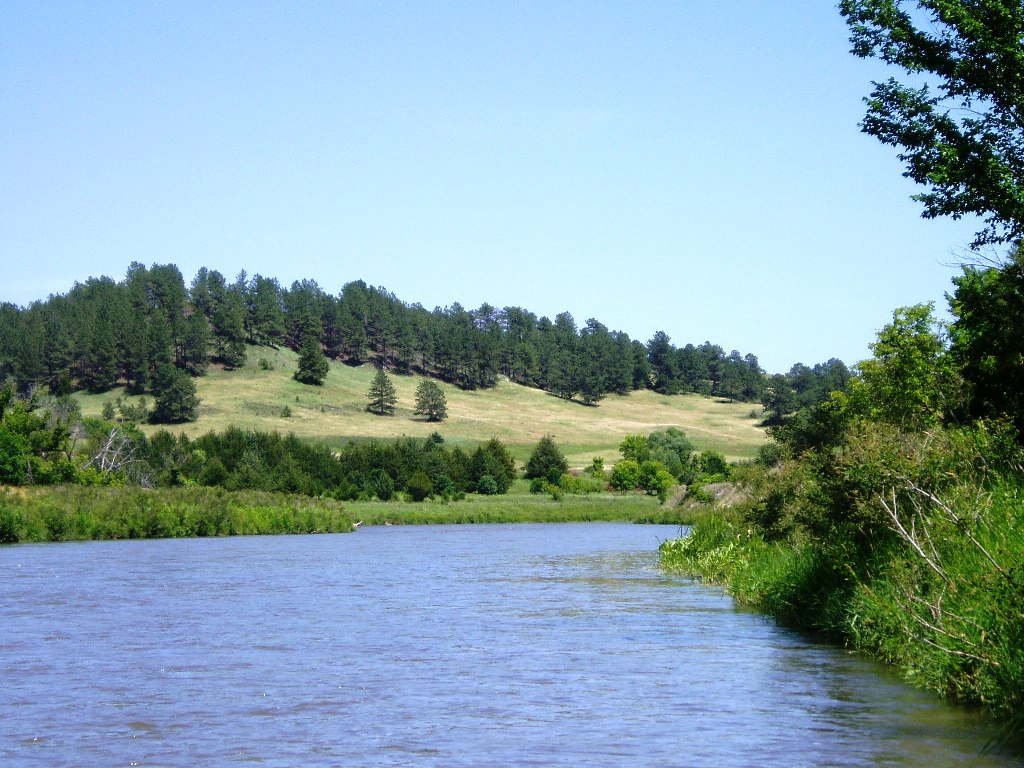
- The Niobrara River runs through a pine-forested valley with prairies in the uplands.

- Location within Nebraska
- Location: Brown Cherry and Keya Paha counties, Nebraska
- Nearest city: Valentine
- Coordinates: 42°47′00″N 100°01′41″W
- Area: 56,000 acres (23,000 ha)
- Established: 1980
- Governing body: The Nature Conservancy
- Website: www.nature.org/ourinitiatives/regions/northamerica/unitedstates/nebraska/placesweprotect/niobrara-valley-preserve.xml

The Niobrara Valley Preserve is a 56,000 acre (226 km sq.) conservation area in Brown and Keya Paha counties of Nebraska owned by The Nature Conservancy.

== History ==
Prior to the European settlement the Niobrara River valley was grazed by large herds of bison and other prairie animals. In the nineteenth century the Ponca Indians inhabited the area near the mouth of the river and the nomadic Lakota or Sioux and other nomadic tribes ranged over the remainder of the watershed. Ranchers began to graze cattle in the region in the 1870s and homesteaders established farms and small ranches here in the 1880s. Most of the Niobrara Valley, however, was not suitable for farming. Most of the farmers soon left and in the twentieth century land was primarily used for grazing cattle on large ranches. With the decline of agriculture the population of Brown and Keya Paha counties decreased substantially between 1890 and 2010.

The Nature Conservancy purchased the Preserve in 1980. It is located within the western half of the 76-mile -long (122 km) Niobrara National Scenic River managed by the National Park Service.

== Description ==
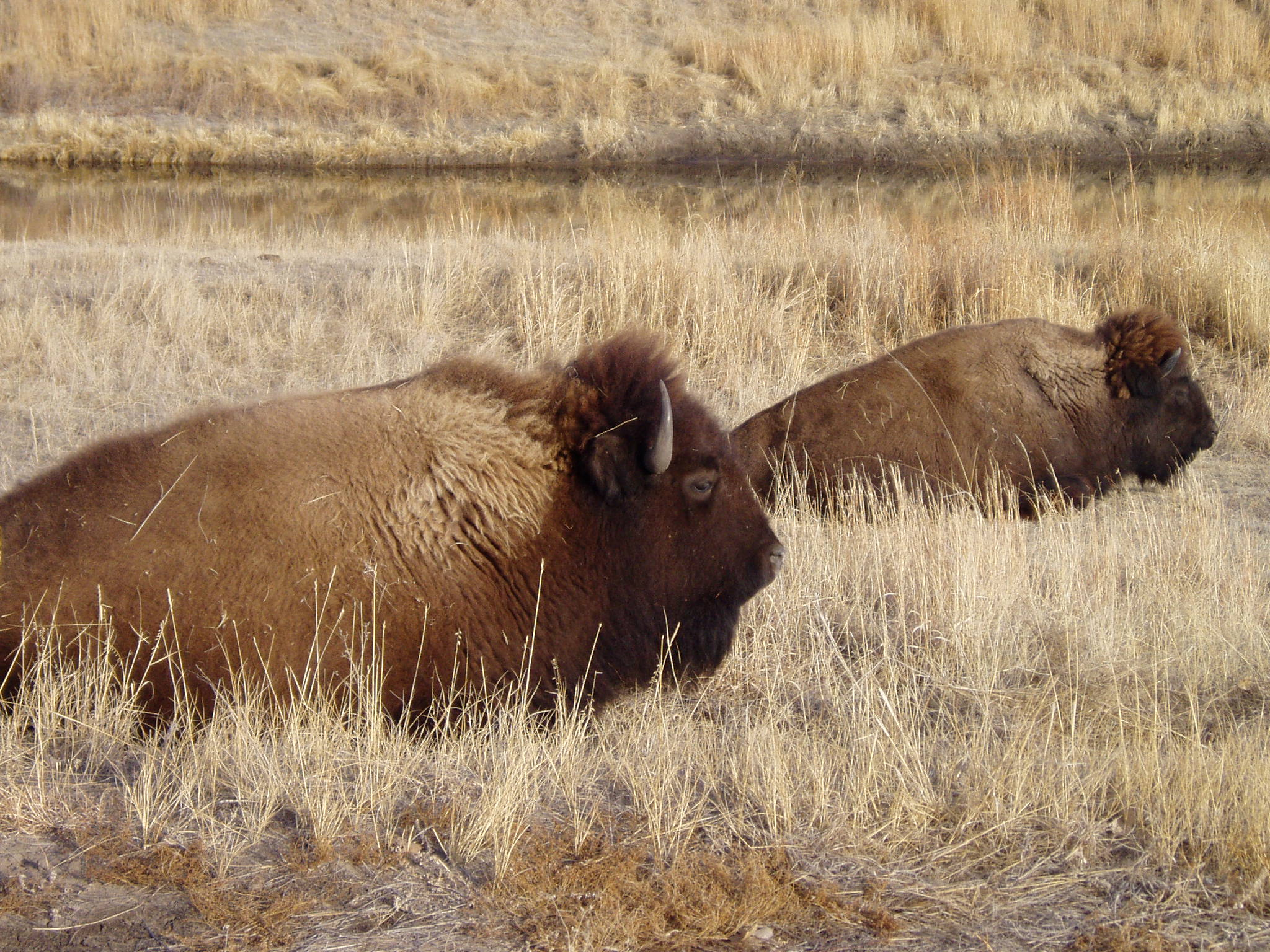
Bison cows at the Niobrara Valley Preserve.

The Niobrara Valley Preserve is one of the largest areas of land devoted to conservation in the Great Plains. The preserve protects 25 miles (40 km) of the south bank of the Niobrara River and 8.5 miles (14 km) of the north bank. Steep hills and bluffs rise up to 400-foot above (120 m) the north bank of the river. The unique Sand Hills approach the river on its south bank.

The preserve is a “biological crossroads” with a mix of six different ecological types: northern boreal, western coniferous, and eastern deciduous forest and mixed grass, tallgrass, and sandhills prairie. 581 species of vascular plants, 213 birds, 86 mosses, 80 lichens, and 85 butterflies are found on the preserve. Notable species include Ponderosa Pine at the eastern limit of its range; a hybrid Quaking and Bigtooth Aspen; and Paper Birch, ordinarily found in more northern climes.

The objective through grazing and fire is to recreate the natural landscape. Controlled burning is used as a management tool to prevent encroachment of woody and non-native plants into prairies and forests. Two thousand cattle are grazed on 27,000 acres (11,000 ha) which are leased for grazing to local ranchers. In 1985, the Nature Conservancy re-introduced bison to the preserve after their absence for more than 100 years. More than 500 bison graze in two pastures of 7,500 and 12,000 acres (3,000 and 4,900 ha). Bison herds grow at a rate that rapidly outpaces the available habitat. Capture is periodically required to manage herd size and provides opportunities to donate live bison in support of partner conservation and restoration efforts. Low-stress handling practices reduce animal stress and increase safety for both bison and personnel during capture operations. The excess bison are distributed through the InterTribal Buffalo Council, a federally recognized tribal organization that delivers live bison to member tribes, supports establishment of tribal bison herds, and supports the historical, cultural, traditional, and spiritual relationship of tribes and bison.

The Conservancy is also helping protect additional land from development or subdivision by concluding agreements with local ranchers for scenic easements.

== Recreation ==
A visitor’s center provides information and illustrates local history and ecology. Tours to view bison are available on appointment. Two hiking trails are located near the visitor’s center, one on the north side of the river, the other on the south side. The trail on the north side is about three-mile-long (4.8 km) and follows the canyon rim overlooking the river. Hunting is permitted for deer and turkey on the preserve.

Floating the 76-mile scenic river (122 km), part of which runs through the preserve, is a major summertime activity. Water levels are usually adequate for canoes and kayaks and outfitters can be found near the Preserve. The Niobrara River is scenic, its water is clear and clean, and there are a few Class I and II rapids. Waterfalls are found in many side canyons as streams descend into the valley. In 2010, about 50,000 people floated the Niobrara River in or near the Preserve, contributing $10 million to the local economy.
