= Dismal River National Forest =

Former National Forest of the United States

Dismal River National Forest was established as the Dismal River Forest Reserve by the United States General Land Office in Nebraska on April 16, 1902 with 85,123 acres (344.48 km^{2}). After the transfer of federal forests to the U.S. Forest Service in 1905, it became a National Forest on March 4, 1907. On July 1, 1908 the lands were transferred to Nebraska National Forest.
