= North Platte National Forest =

Former National Forest of the United States

North Platte National Forest was established as the North Platte Forest Reserve by the United States General Land Office in Nebraska on March 10, 1902 with 347,170 acres (1,404.9 km^{2}). After the transfer of federal forests to the U.S. Forest Service in 1905, it became a National Forest on March 4, 1907. On July 1, 1908 the entire forest was combined with Nebraska National Forest and the name was discontinued.
