= Norway, Nebraska =

Unincorporated community in Nebraska, U.S.

- Unincorporated community
- Location within the state of Nebraska
- Coordinates: 41°59′56″N 100°43′06″W
- Country: United States
- State: Nebraska
- County: Thomas
- Elevation: 2,920 ft (890 m)
- Time zone: UTC-6 (Central (CST))
  - Summer (DST): UTC-5 (CDT)
- GNIS feature ID: 835393

Norway is an unincorporated community in Thomas County, Nebraska, United States. Norway is roughly 7 miles west of Thedford, and is located along the Middle Loup River.

== History ==
Norway was established in the 1880s when the Chicago, Burlington and Quincy Railroad was extended to that point. A large share of the early settlers being natives of Norway likely caused the name to be selected. The first post office in Norway opened in 1887, and operated until 1935.
