= Sandhills (Nebraska) =

Temperate grasslands, savannas, and shrublands ecoregion of Nebraska, United States

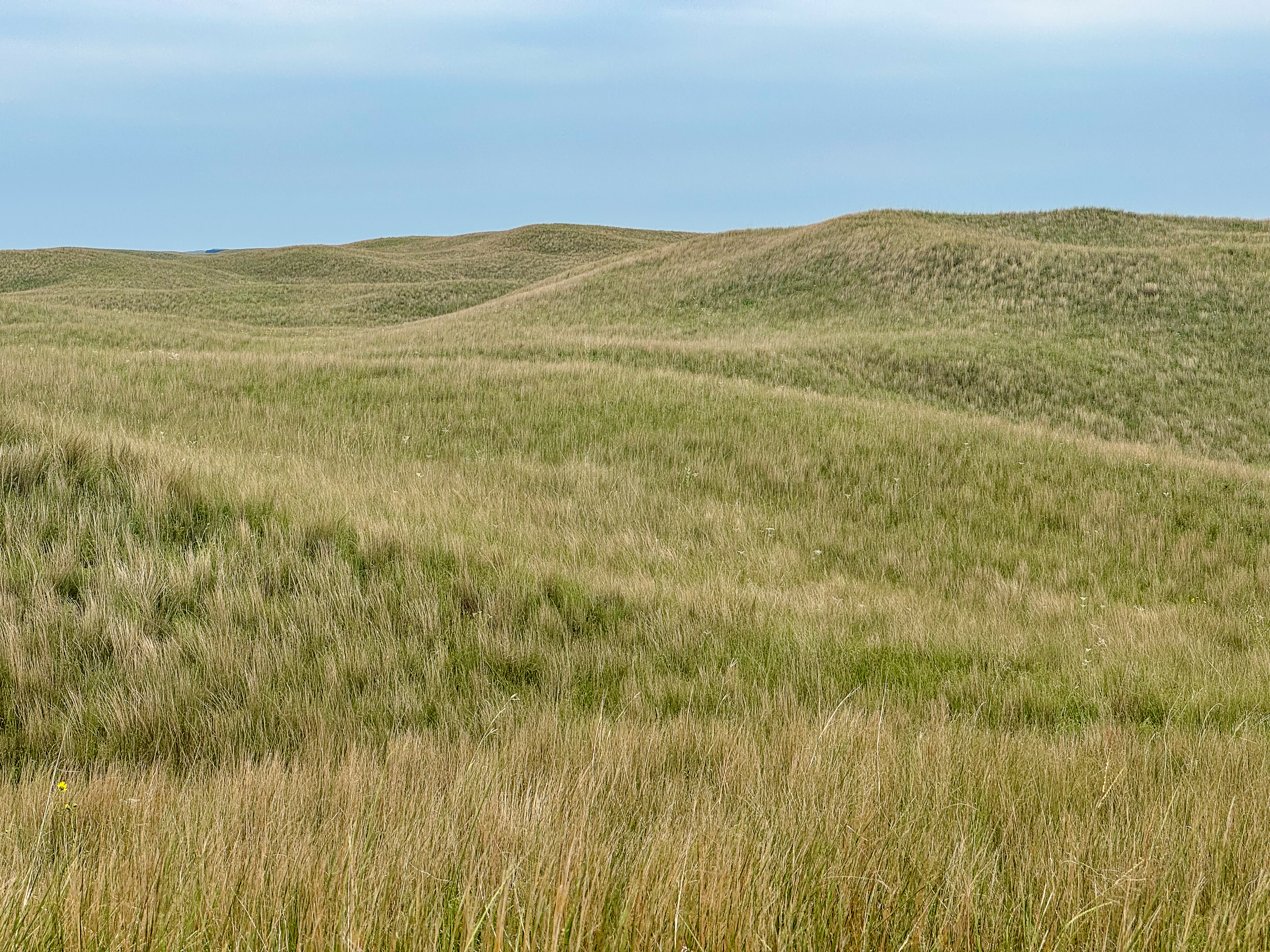
- Sandhills in Thomas County, Nebraska

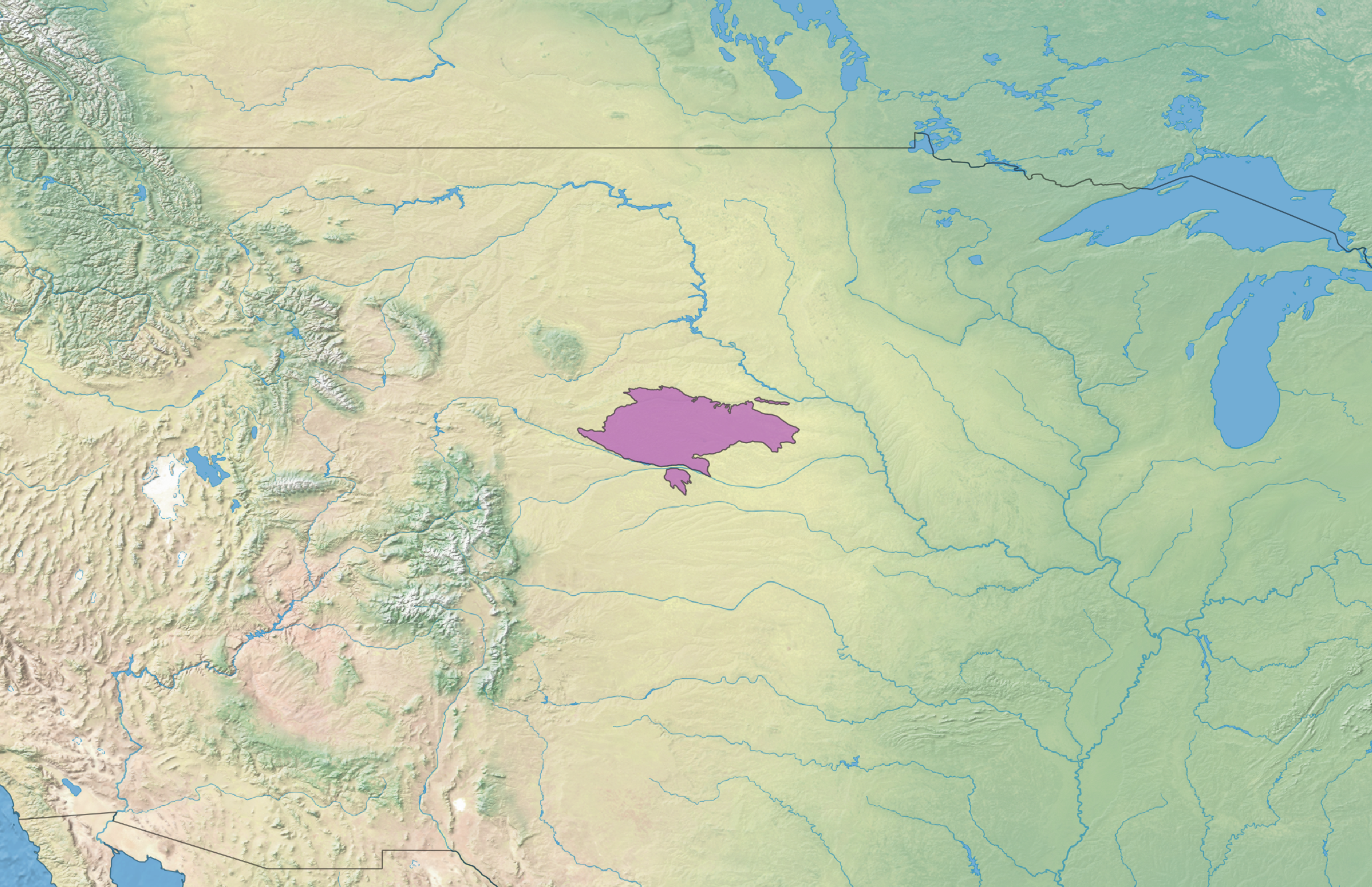
- The Sandhills covers portions of northern and western Nebraska.
- Area: 19,600 mi^{2} (51,000 km^{2})

Geography
- Country: United States
- State: Nebraska
- Region: High Plains
- Coordinates: 42.13°N 102.19°W
- Rivers: List: Niobrara River; Snake River; North Loup River; Middle Loup River; Dismal River

U.S. National Natural Landmark
- Designated: 1984

The Sandhills, often written Sand Hills, is a region of mixed-grass prairie on grass-stabilized sand dunes in north-central Nebraska, covering just over one quarter of the state. The dunes were designated a National Natural Landmark in 1984.

== Geography ==
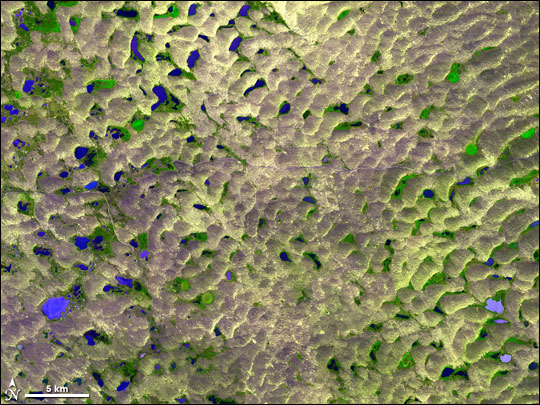
Sand Hills from space, September 2001

The boundaries of the Sandhills are variously defined by different organizations. Depending on the definition, the region's area can be as small as 19,600 mi^{2} (50,760 km^{2}) or as large as 23,600 mi^{2} (61,100 km^{2}).

Dunes in the Sandhills may exceed 330 ft (100 m) in height. The average elevation of the region gradually increases from about 1,800 ft (550 m) in the east to about 3,600 ft (1,100 m) in the west.

The Sandhills sit atop the massive Ogallala Aquifer; thus both temporary and permanent shallow lakes are common in low-lying valleys between the grass-stabilized dunes prevalent in the Sandhills. The eastern and central sections of the region are drained by tributaries of the Loup River and the Niobrara River, while the western section is largely composed of small interior drainage basins.

The World Wide Fund for Nature (WWF) designated the Sandhills as an ecoregion, distinct from other grasslands of the Great Plains. According to their assessment, as much as 85% of the ecoregion is intact natural habitat, the highest level in the Great Plains. This is chiefly due to the lack of crop production; most of the Sandhills land has never been plowed.

=== Climate ===
The Sandhills is classified as a semi-arid region, with average annual rainfall varying from 23 inches (580 mm) in the east to less than 17 inches (430 mm) of rain in the west. Temperatures range from lows of −30 °F (−34 °C) to highs of 105 °F (41 °C).

=== Paleoclimate and future ===
Paleoclimate proxy data and computer simulations reveal that the Nebraska Sandhills likely had active sand dunes as recently as the Medieval Warm Period, when temperatures in the North Atlantic region were about 1 °C (1.8 °F) warmer than the current climate. Much of the area was a scrub desert, with desert-like conditions extending to several other states. Current global warming may make the grassland climate more unstable, giving way to desert given more fires, mild drought and erosion; UCAR simulations based on evapotranspiration support a Palmer Drought Index lower than -15, many times more severe than Texas during the Dust Bowl.

== History ==
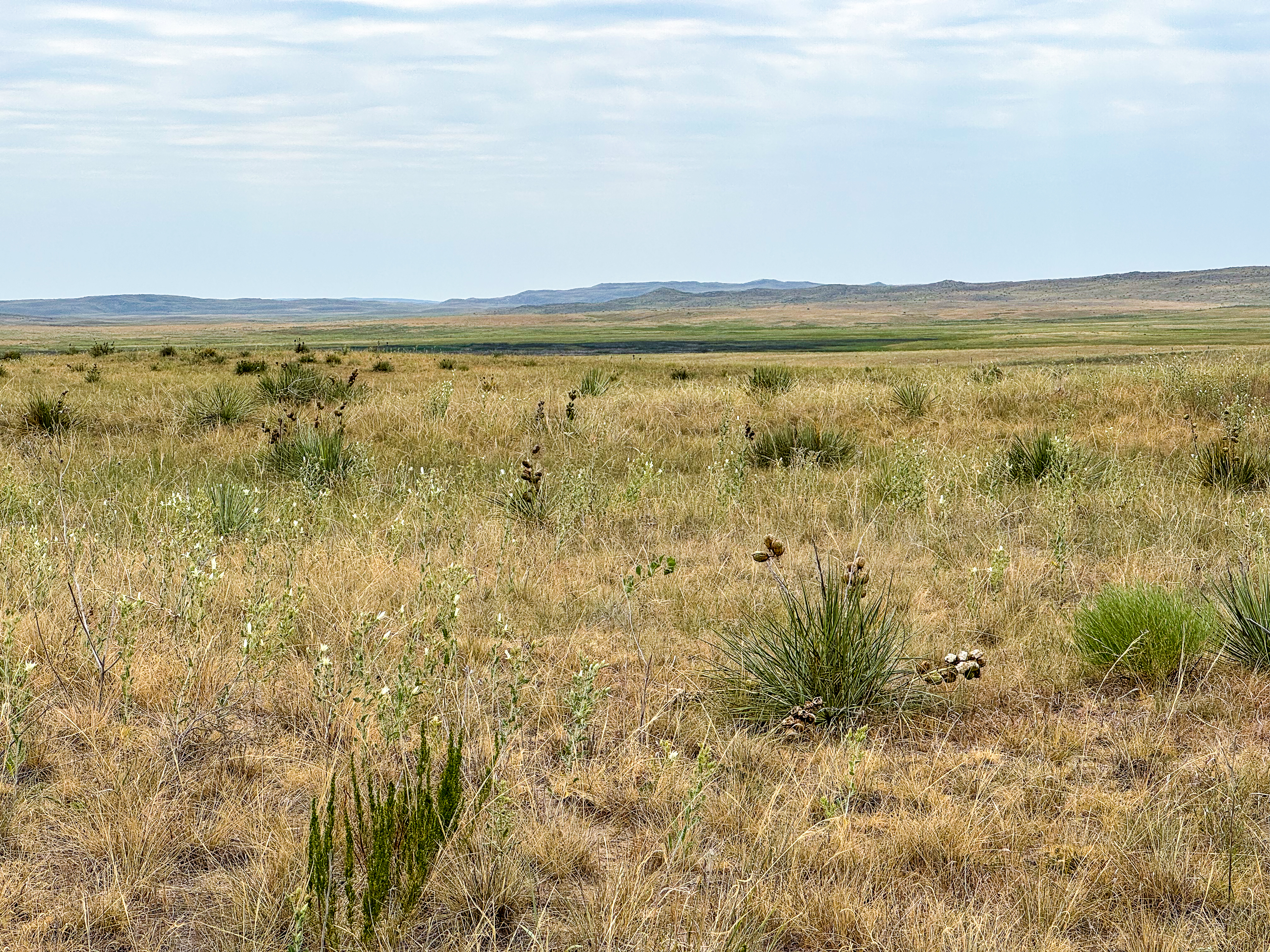
Alkaline lakes area in Sheridan County

The plant-anchored dunes of the Sandhills were long considered an irreclaimable desert. In the 1870s, cattlemen began to discover their potential as rangeland for Longhorn cattle.

The fragility of the sandy soil makes the area unsuitable for cultivation of crops. Attempts at farming were made in the region in the late 1870s and again around 1890.

The 1904 Kinkaid Act allowed homesteaders to claim 640 acres (260 ha; 2.6 km^{2}) of land, rather than the 160 acres (65 ha; 0.65 km^{2}) allowed by the 1862 Homestead Act. Nearly nine million acres (36,000 km^{2}) were claimed by "Kinkaiders" between 1910 and 1917. Some of the Kinkaiders farmed the land, but these attempts generally failed. This included Nebraska's largest black settlement, DeWitty, which was located in southeast Cherry County until the 1930s. Many of the largest ranches broke up about the same time due to regulations against fencing federal range lands.

Some development of cropland agriculture in the modern era has occurred through the use of center-pivot irrigation systems.

In the 21st century, the Sandhills are a productive cattle ranching area, supporting over 530,000 beef cattle. The human population of the region continues to decline as older generations die out, younger generations move to the cities, and ranches are consolidated. A number of small towns remain in the region.

== Ecology ==
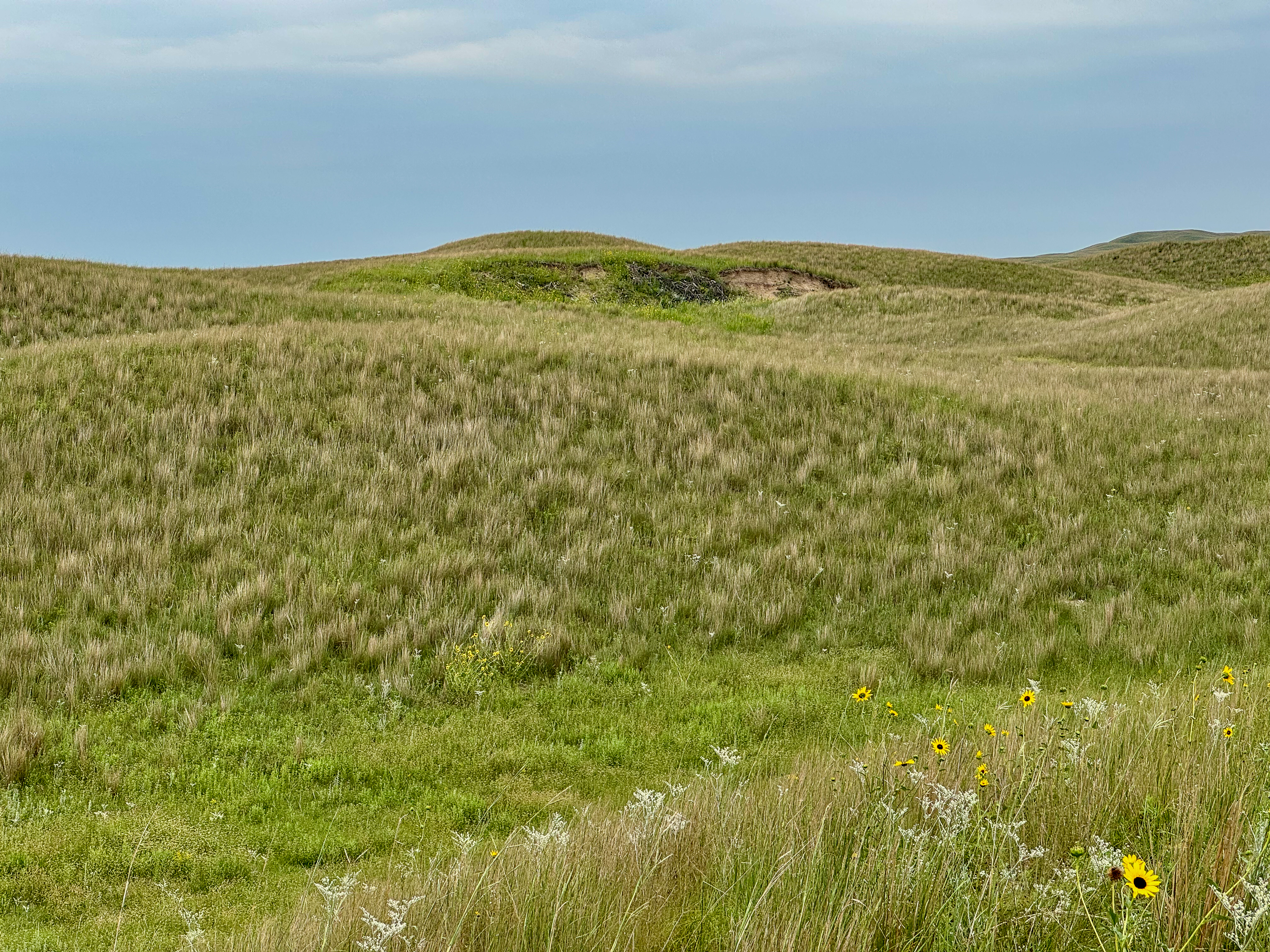
Sand Hills Grassland Near Seneca, Nebraska

The Sandhills contain a large array of plant and animal life. Minimal crop production has led to limited land fragmentation; the resulting extensive and continuous habitat for plant and animal species has largely preserved the biodiversity of the area.

The Sandhills are home to 314 vertebrate species including mule deer, whitetail deer, jackrabbits, pronghorn antelope, elk, coyotes, red fox, Western meadowlarks (the Nebraska state bird), prairie dogs, bull snakes, prairie rattlesnakes, ringnecked pheasant, sharp-tailed grouse, badgers, ground squirrels, skunks, native bat species and many fish species.

The Sandhills' thousands of ponds and lakes are spring-fed surface water areas of the Ogallala Aquifer. Precipitation is insufficient to keep ponds and lakes permanent with the low humidity and high evaporation rates. The natural reservoirs are also primarily confined to a few regions of the Sandhills with the vast majority located in northern Garden County. The lakes and ponds are mainly sandy-bottomed, and some contain many species of fish. Very few are used to water cattle, as the water is usually shallow, warm, brackish, turbid (cloudy), saline, or alkaline; ponds may also conceal "quicksand" that could trap cattle. Easily accessible aquifer water (groundwater) is commonly pumped by windmills and solar-powered submersible electric pumps to fill cement-bottom steel stock tanks up to 30 feet (9.1 metres) in diameter, to supply livestock with cool, fresh water. Some alkaline lakes in the area support several species of phyllopod shrimp.

=== Plants ===
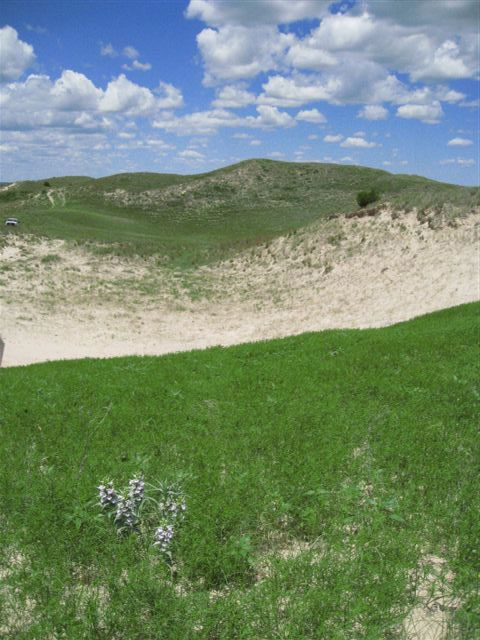
A Sandhills blowout, home to an unusual community of plants in McKelvie National Forest, Nebraska

720 different species of plants are found in the Sandhills. Most are native, with only 7% exotics — half the percentage of most other prairie systems. Most of the "exotics" are invasive species and considered noxious weeds and must be destroyed by landowners. One species threatening the ecosystem is the eastern redcedar. Native to the region but controlled by wildfires prior to European settlement, the trees were planted in great numbers as a windbreak around homesteads and during early Arbor Day events during early settlement. Over time, the trees spread to replace large areas of grassland, leading to ecosystem collapse on ranchlands.

The blowout penstemon (Penstemon haydenii) is an endangered species, found only in the Sandhills and in similar environments in central Wyoming. The blowout penstemon stabilizes the soil where wind erosion exposes the bare sand and creates a blowout, but is choked out when other species begin to recolonize. Grazing and land management practices used by Sandhills ranchers have reduced natural erosion, thus destroying some of the plant's habitat.

Many of the plants of the Sandhills are sand-tolerant species from short-grass, mixed-grass, and tallgrass prairies; plants from all three of these can be found within the ecosystem. These plants have helped to stabilize the sand dunes, creating an ecosystem beneficial for other plants and animals. Better land management and grazing practices by the ranchers of the region have led to less erosion over time, which has kept the natural landscape of the area mostly intact.

=== Insects ===
Many species of insect are found in the Sandhills, including dragonflies, grasshoppers and mosquitos. There are also many types of spiders. Due to the warm stagnant nature of both alkaline and freshwater lakes throughout the region, coupled with the wetland marsh areas, mosquito populations increase during the summer months.

=== Birds ===
The Sandhills are part of the Central Flyway for many species of migratory birds, and the region's many bodies of water give them places to rest. The ponds and lakes of the region are lay-over points for migratory cranes (particularly Sandhill cranes), geese, and many species of ducks. Species found year-round include the western meadowlark, the state bird of Nebraska.

== Conservation efforts and protection ==
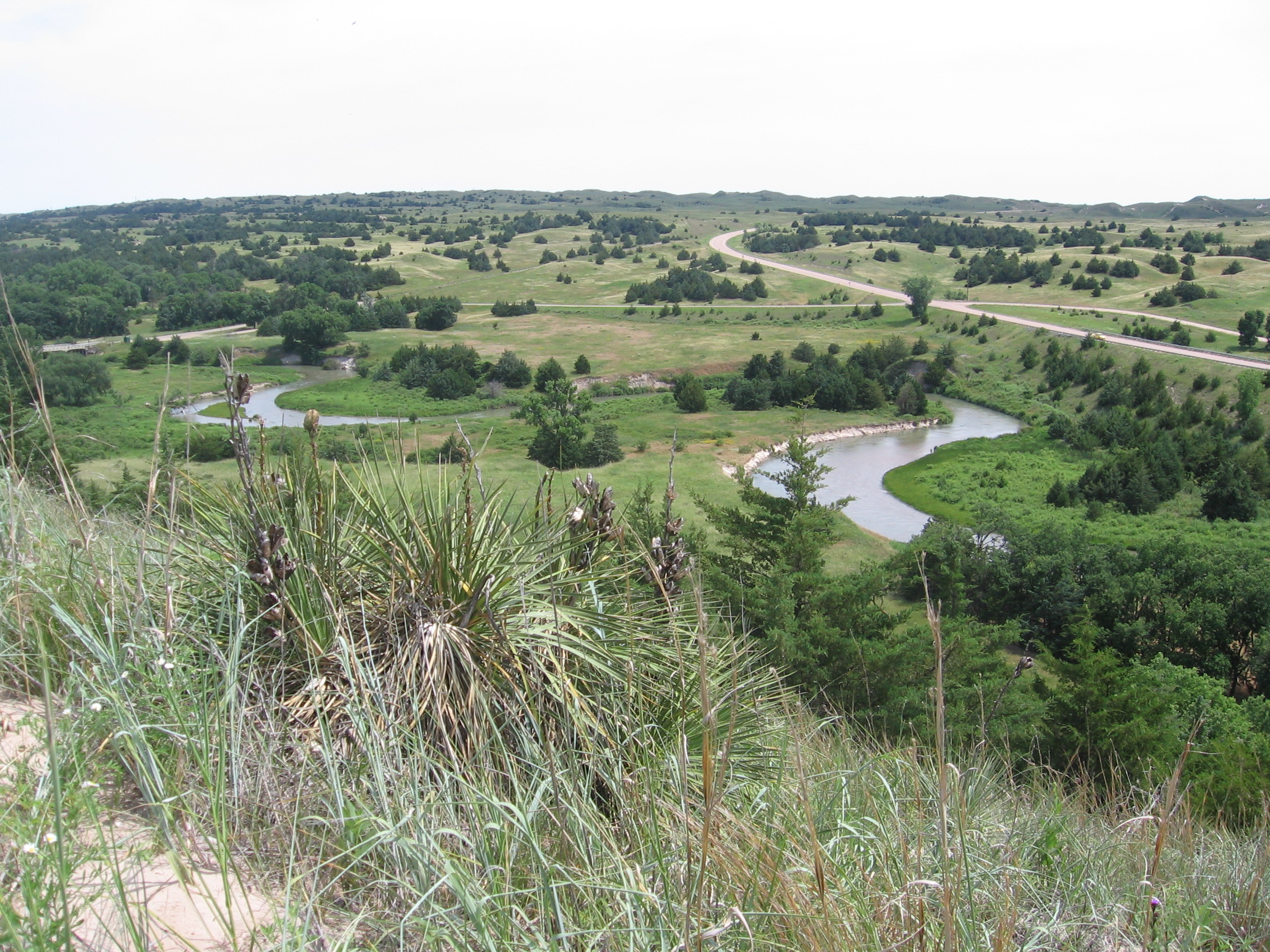
A view of the Dismal River and Nebraska Sandhills in Thomas County.

Valentine National Wildlife Refuge, located about 20 miles (32 km) south of Valentine, encompasses 71,516 acres (28,941 ha). Crescent Lake National Wildlife Refuge in the central Panhandle covers 45,849 acres (18,554 ha). The Nature conservancy's Niobrara Valley Preserve in Cherry, Brown, and Keya Paha counties covers 60,000 acres (240 km^{2}) and includes a 25-mile (40 km) stretch of the river. Fort Niobrara National Wildlife Refuge near Valentine covers 19,000 acres (77 km^{2}). Partnering in the effort to conserve the Sandhills are the Institute of Agriculture and Natural Resources, West Central Research and Extension Station, the Nature Conservancy of Nebraska, the Natural Resources Conservation Service, the Nebraska Natural Heritage Program, the University of Nebraska, and the United States Fish and Wildlife Service.

Turner Enterprises has acquired 445,000 acres (180,000 ha) of land in Nebraska. His extensive ranches for grazing cattle are known for their bison while focusing on sustainable practices such as rotational grazing of the grasslands. In 2021, Ted Turner announced that an 80,000-acre (32,000 ha) ranch he owns in western Nebraska would be turned over to the newly created Turner Institute of Ecoagriculture. Turner and the institute publicly announced that the nonprofit would continue to pay property taxes on the land.

=== TransCanada Keystone XL Project ===
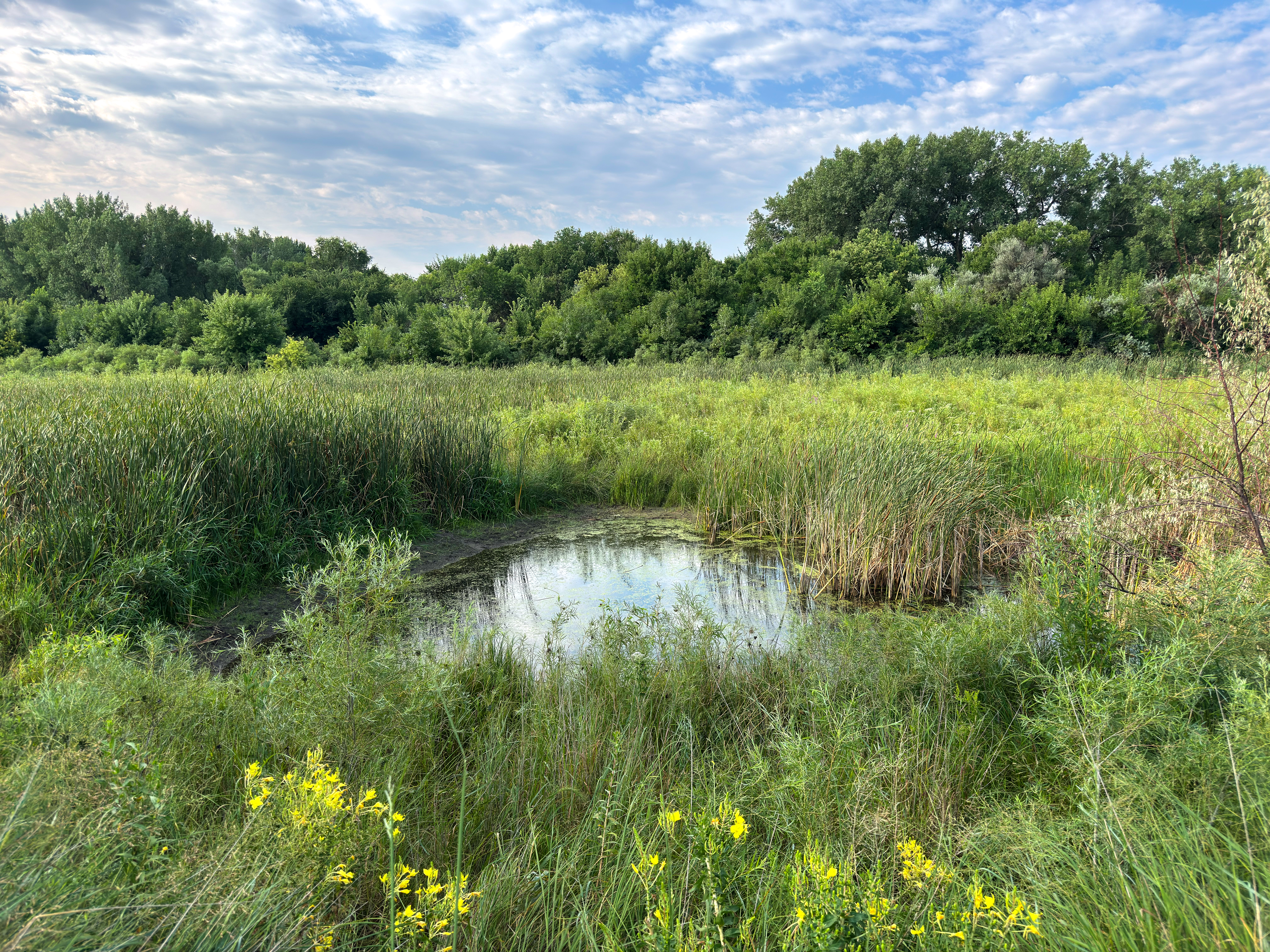
Red-Wing State Wildlife Management Area, Nebraska

A November 10, 2011 press release on the Keystone Pipeline Project Presidential Permit Review Process, announced that the U. S. State Department would assess TransCanada Keystone XL Project (Hardisty-Baker-Steele City) proposal. "[G]iven the concentration of concerns regarding the environmental sensitivities of the current proposed route through the Sand Hills area of Nebraska, the Department has determined it needs to undertake an in-depth assessment of potential alternative routes in Nebraska [...] The comments were consistent with the information in the final Environmental Impact Statement (EIS) about the unique combination of characteristics in the Sand Hills (which includes a high concentration of wetlands of special concern, a sensitive ecosystem, and extensive areas of very shallow groundwater) and provided additional context and information about those characteristics. The concern about the proposed route's impact on the Sand Hills of Nebraska has increased significantly over time, and has resulted in the Nebraska legislature convening a special session to consider the issue."

On November 3, 2015, the request for a Presidential Permit was denied.

== See also ==
- Aeolian processes
- Barchan
- Blowout
- Desertification
- Dune
- Dust Bowl
- Kinkaid Act
- List of ecoregions in the United States (WWF)
- Sandhill
