= Harrison, Nebraska =

- Village
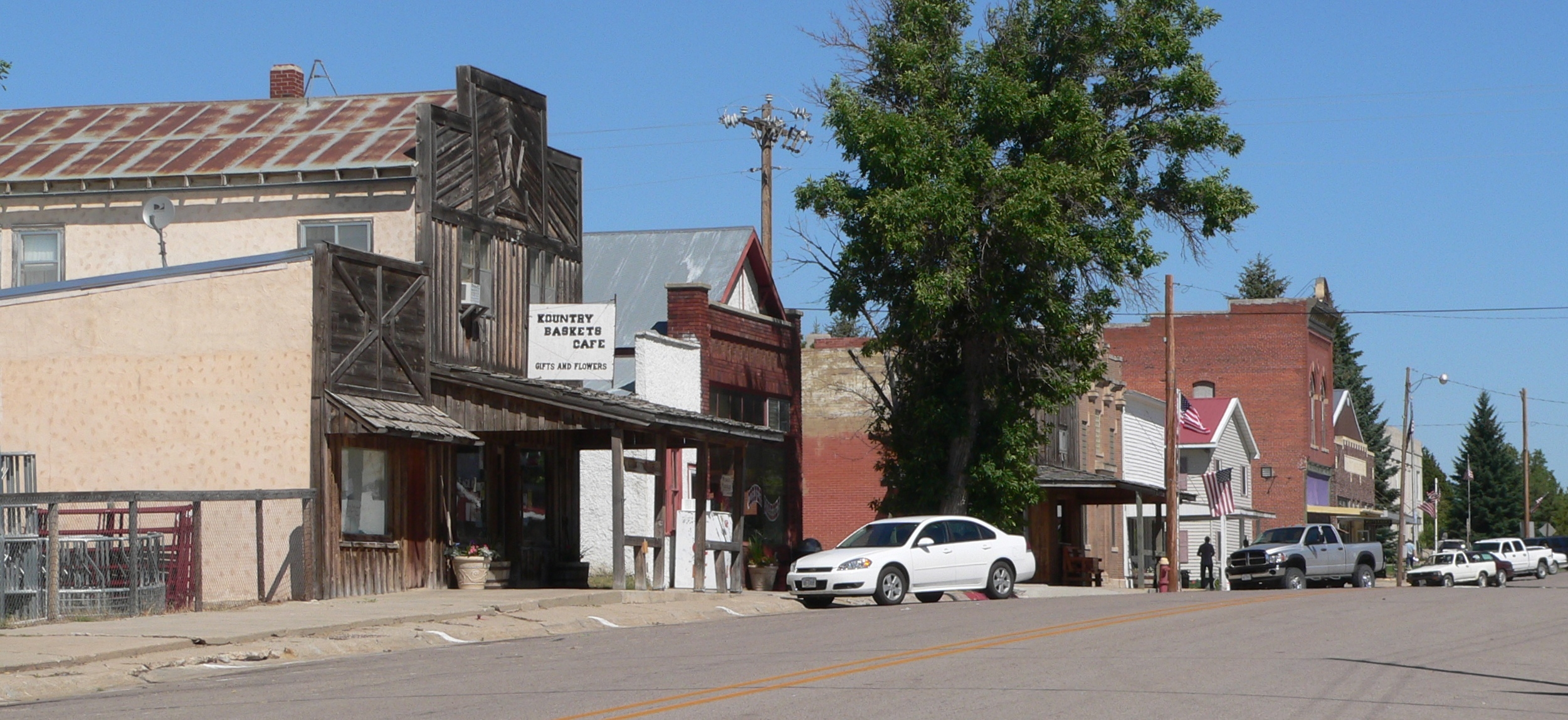
- Main Street (Nebraska Highway 29) (2010)

- Location within Sioux County and Nebraska
- Coordinates: 42°41′17″N 103°52′57″W
- Country: United States
- State: Nebraska
- County: Sioux

Area
  - Total: 0.31 sq mi (0.79 km^{2})
  - Land: 0.31 sq mi (0.79 km^{2})
  - Water: 0 sq mi (0.00 km^{2})
- Elevation: 4,872 ft (1,485 m)

Population (2020)
  - Total: 239
  - Density: 781.3/sq mi (301.67/km^{2})
- Time zone: UTC-7 (Mountain (MST))
  - Summer (DST): UTC-6 (MDT)
- ZIP code: 69346
- Area code: 308
- FIPS code: 31-21240
- GNIS feature ID: 2398253
- Website: www.villageofharrisonne.com

Harrison is a village in Sioux County, Nebraska, United States. The population was 239 at the 2020 census. It is the county seat of Sioux County.

== History ==
Harrison was originally called Bowen, and under that name was platted in 1886, when the Fremont, Elkhorn, & Missouri Valley Railroad was extended to that point. It was renamed Harrison in 1887, in honor of Benjamin Harrison. Harrison was incorporated in 1889.

== Geography ==
Harrison is located on the American Great Plains. According to the United States Census Bureau, the village has a total area of 0.31 square miles (0.80 km^{2}), all land.

At 4,876 feet (1,486 m), Harrison has the highest elevation of any town in Nebraska, prompting it to bill itself as "Nebraska's Top Town".

The area around Harrison largely consists of grass-covered plains. Grasses and other flora present include little bluestem, prairie sandreed, blue grama, and needle and thread grass. Wildflowers in the area include lupin, spiderwort, western wallflower, and sunflowers.

=== Climate ===
Harrison has a humid continental climate (Köppen Dwb), with high diurnal temperature variation year round as a result of its high elevation and far inland location.

Climate data for Harrison, Nebraska (1991–2020 normals, extremes 1914–present)
Month	Jan	Feb	Mar	Apr	May	Jun	Jul	Aug	Sep	Oct	Nov	Dec	Year
Record high °F (°C)	67 (19)	69 (21)	79 (26)	86 (30)	94 (34)	103 (39)	107 (42)	102 (39)	100 (38)	89 (32)	76 (24)	73 (23)	107 (42)
Mean maximum °F (°C)	53.7 (12.1)	56.0 (13.3)	68.4 (20.2)	76.3 (24.6)	85.0 (29.4)	91.8 (33.2)	96.7 (35.9)	95.1 (35.1)	91.0 (32.8)	80.3 (26.8)	67.3 (19.6)	55.5 (13.1)	97.8 (36.6)
Mean daily maximum °F (°C)	34.8 (1.6)	36.5 (2.5)	46.7 (8.2)	54.5 (12.5)	64.4 (18.0)	76.4 (24.7)	85.0 (29.4)	83.4 (28.6)	73.8 (23.2)	58.3 (14.6)	44.9 (7.2)	35.4 (1.9)	57.8 (14.3)
Daily mean °F (°C)	23.1 (−4.9)	24.8 (−4.0)	33.8 (1.0)	41.3 (5.2)	51.6 (10.9)	62.6 (17.0)	70.2 (21.2)	68.2 (20.1)	58.3 (14.6)	44.4 (6.9)	32.5 (0.3)	23.9 (−4.5)	44.6 (7.0)
Mean daily minimum °F (°C)	11.5 (−11.4)	13.0 (−10.6)	21.0 (−6.1)	28.2 (−2.1)	38.8 (3.8)	48.9 (9.4)	55.5 (13.1)	52.9 (11.6)	42.9 (6.1)	30.5 (−0.8)	20.0 (−6.7)	12.5 (−10.8)	31.3 (−0.4)
Mean minimum °F (°C)	−11.5 (−24.2)	−7.7 (−22.1)	1.2 (−17.1)	11.3 (−11.5)	23.8 (−4.6)	36.2 (2.3)	44.2 (6.8)	41.2 (5.1)	28.3 (−2.1)	11.3 (−11.5)	0.1 (−17.7)	−10.3 (−23.5)	−18.8 (−28.2)
Record low °F (°C)	−33 (−36)	−35 (−37)	−20 (−29)	−10 (−23)	5 (−15)	23 (−5)	34 (1)	29 (−2)	3 (−16)	−12 (−24)	−23 (−31)	−39 (−39)	−39 (−39)
Average precipitation inches (mm)	0.36 (9.1)	0.49 (12)	1.01 (26)	2.22 (56)	3.67 (93)	2.86 (73)	1.94 (49)	1.39 (35)	1.35 (34)	1.31 (33)	0.53 (13)	0.42 (11)	17.55 (446)
Average snowfall inches (cm)	6.2 (16)	10.0 (25)	10.9 (28)	8.1 (21)	2.7 (6.9)	0.0 (0.0)	0.0 (0.0)	0.0 (0.0)	0.9 (2.3)	3.8 (9.7)	5.5 (14)	8.5 (22)	56.6 (144)
Average precipitation days (≥ 0.01 in)	4.6	5.3	6.4	8.4	11.6	10.1	9.1	6.9	6.9	6.2	4.5	4.8	84.8
Average snowy days (≥ 0.1 in)	3.6	4.3	3.6	2.5	0.8	0.0	0.0	0.0	0.3	1.4	2.8	3.9	23.2
Source: NOAA

== Demographics ==
Historical population
Census	Pop.	Note	%±
1890	111		—
1900	168		51.4%
1910	186		10.7%
1920	401		115.6%
1930	480		19.7%
1940	500		4.2%
1950	492		−1.6%
1960	448		−8.9%
1970	377		−15.8%
1980	361		−4.2%
1990	291		−19.4%
2000	279		−4.1%
2010	251		−10.0%
2020	239		−4.8%
U.S. Decennial Census

=== 2010 census ===
As of the census of 2010, there were 251 people, 134 households, and 69 families residing in the village. The population density was 809.7 inhabitants per square mile (312.6/km^{2}). There were 186 housing units at an average density of 600.0 per square mile (231.7/km^{2}). The racial makeup of the village was 98.4% White and 1.6% from two or more races. Hispanic or Latino of any race were 1.6% of the population.

There were 134 households, of which 20.1% had children under the age of 18 living with them, 41.8% were married couples living together, 6.7% had a female householder with no husband present, 3.0% had a male householder with no wife present, and 48.5% were non-families. 47.0% of all households were made up of individuals, and 23.9% had someone living alone who was 65 years of age or older. The average household size was 1.87 and the average family size was 2.67.

The median age in the village was 50.7 years. 19.5% of residents were under the age of 18; 4.9% were between the ages of 18 and 24; 20.4% were from 25 to 44; 27.2% were from 45 to 64; and 28.3% were 65 years of age or older. The gender makeup of the village was 46.6% male and 53.4% female.

=== 2000 census ===
As of the census of 2000, there were 279 people, 137 households, and 80 families residing in the village. The population density was 905.5 inhabitants per square mile (349.6/km^{2}). There were 179 housing units at an average density of 580.9 per square mile (224.3/km^{2}). The racial makeup of the village was 98.92% White, 0.36% from other races, and 0.72% from two or more races. Hispanic or Latino of any race were 0.72% of the population.

There were 137 households, out of which 16.1% had children under the age of 18 living with them, 44.5% were married couples living together, 12.4% had a female householder with no husband present, and 41.6% were non-families. 40.9% of all households were made up of individuals, and 24.1% had someone living alone who was 65 years of age or older. The average household size was 2.04 and the average family size was 2.68.

In the village, the population was spread out, with 17.9% under the age of 18, 8.6% from 18 to 24, 17.9% from 25 to 44, 27.6% from 45 to 64, and 28.0% who were 65 years of age or older. The median age was 48 years. For every 100 females, there were 93.8 males. For every 100 females age 18 and over, there were 80.3 males.

As of 2000 the median income for a household in the village was $29,375, and the median income for a family was $29,688. Males had a median income of $25,500 versus $21,250 for females. The per capita income for the village was $15,071. About 11.8% of families and 18.6% of the population were below the poverty line, including 33.8% of those under the age of eighteen and 10.8% of those 65 or over.

== Area attractions ==
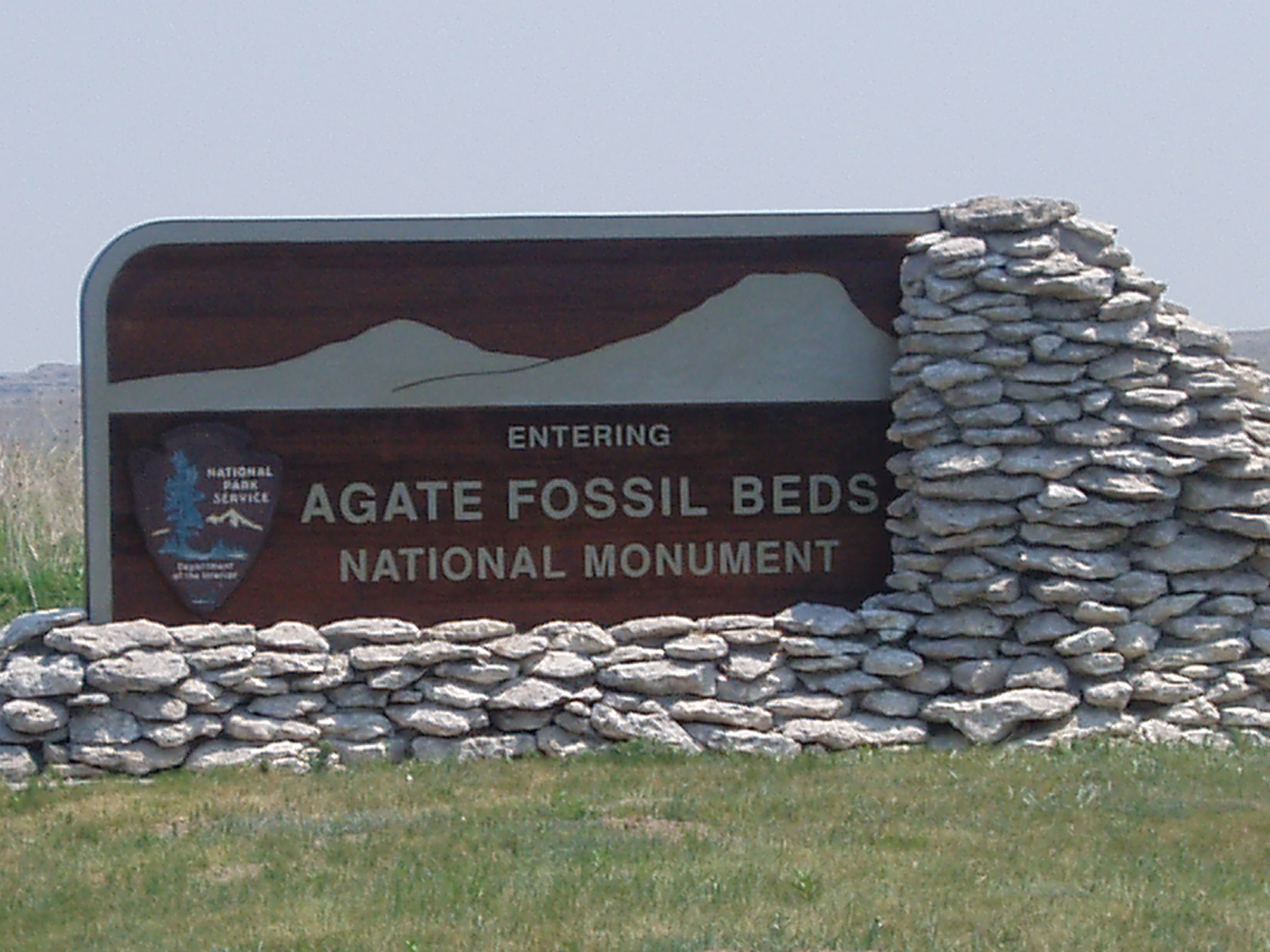
Entrance to Agate Fossil Beds National Monument (2007)

Agate Fossil Beds National Monument, maintained by the National Park Service, is 25 minutes south of Harrison on River Road, Nebraska State Route 29. The site is best known for the large number of well-preserved Miocene mammal fossils on display, which date from about 20 million years ago, and are among some of the best specimens of Miocene mammals. The monument's museum collection also contains more than 500 items from the Cook Collection of Plains Indian artifacts, originally from the Agate Springs Ranch, a working cattle ranch, owned by Harold J. Cook. The Cook Homestead (Bone Cabin Complex) is listed on the National Register of Historic Places.

== Highways ==
- US 20 (U.S. Route 20) - east–west route through Harrison (Bridges to Buttes Byway)
- N-29 (Nebraska Highway 29) - route going south out of Harrison (Main Street)

== Notable people ==
- Dwight Griswold, Governor of Nebraska from 1940 to 1946, and U.S. Senator from 1952 to 1954, was born in Harrison.

== See also ==
- Sowbelly Canyon
