= Soldier Creek Wilderness =

Wilderness area in Nebraska, United States

- IUCN category Ib (wilderness area)
- Location within the United States
- Location: Sioux County, Nebraska, USA
- Nearest city: Chadron, NE
- Coordinates: 42°41′20″N 103°36′22″W
- Area: 7,794 acres (31.54 km^{2})
- Established: 1986
- Governing body: U.S. Forest Service

Soldier Creek Wilderness is located in the U.S. state of Nebraska. Created by an act of Congress in 1986, the wilderness is managed by the U.S. Forest Service and covers an area of 7,794 acres (31.54 km^{2}) within the Pine Ridge section of the Nebraska National Forest. The wilderness experienced a large wildfire in 1989, which destroyed almost 90 percent of the ponderosa pine forest, which today is slowly rebounding. The Bald eagle can be found here, as can white-tailed deer, mule deer, bobcats, coyotes and numerous other mammals. The region, which was originally established as a timber reservation for nearby Fort Robinson, was utilized by the U.S. Cavalry from the late 19th century through World War II for its excellent horse pastures along Soldier Creek. A series of trails pass two windmills that are still functioning, even though they are not maintained and are over 100 years old. A popular destination for horseback riding, the wilderness is the larger of the two federally-designated wilderness areas in Nebraska.

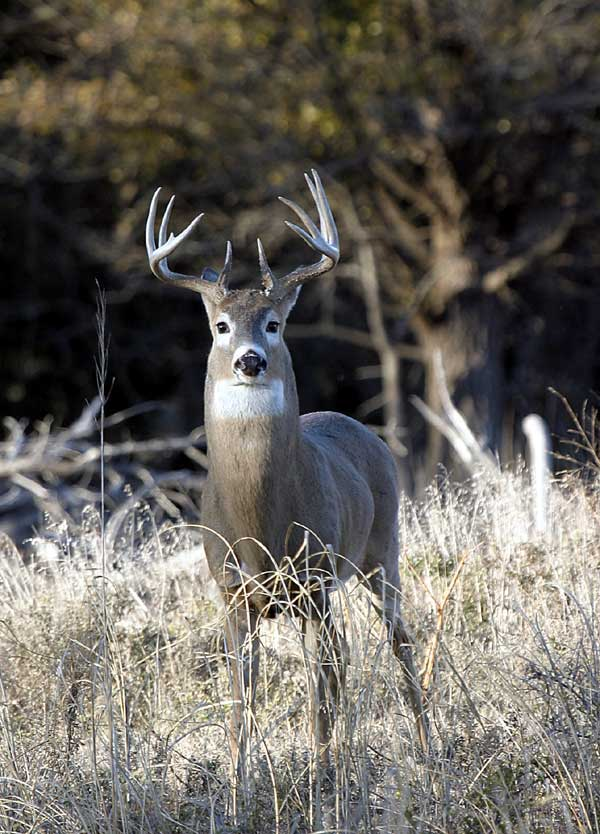
White-tailed deer.

U.S. Wilderness Areas do not allow motorized or mechanized vehicles, including bicycles. Although camping and fishing are allowed with a proper permit, no roads or buildings are constructed and there is also no logging or mining, in compliance with the 1964 Wilderness Act. Wilderness areas within National Forests and Bureau of Land Management areas also allow hunting (in season).

== See also ==
- List of U.S. Wilderness Areas
- Wilderness Act
