= Thomas County, Nebraska =

County in Nebraska, United States

- County
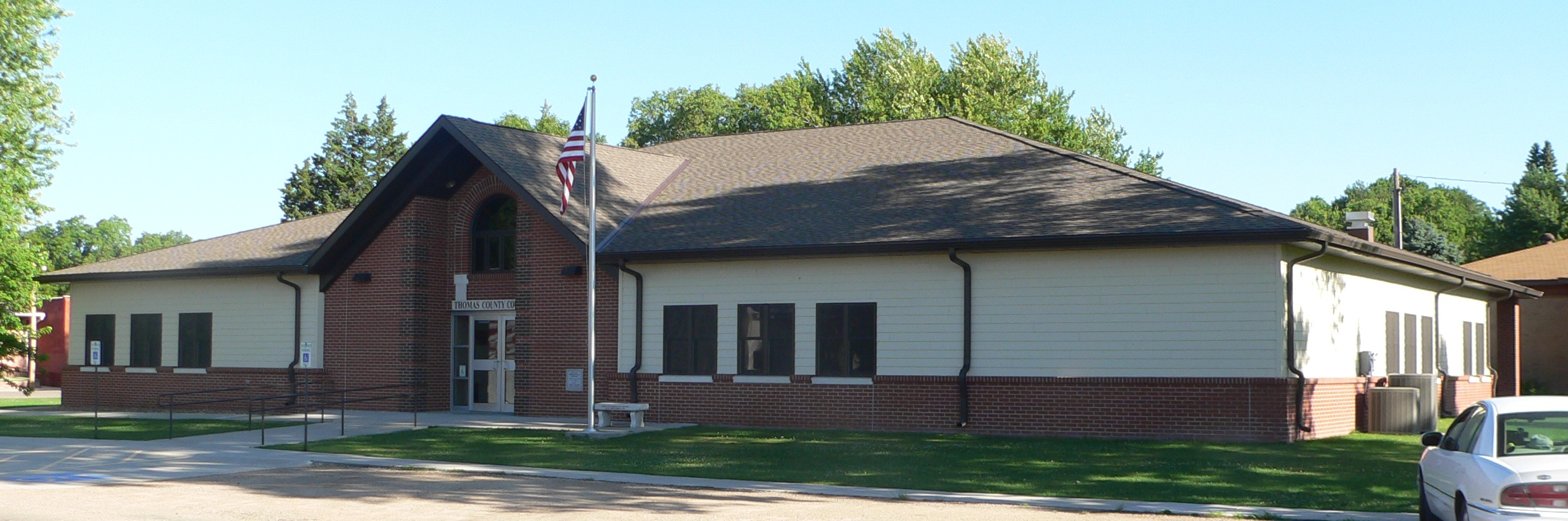
- Thomas County Courthouse in Thedford

- Location within the U.S. state of Nebraska
- Coordinates: 41°55′N 100°35′W
- Country: United States
- State: Nebraska
- Founded: 1887
- Named for: George Henry Thomas
- Seat: Thedford
- Largest village: Thedford

Area
  - Total: 714 sq mi (1,850 km^{2})
  - Land: 713 sq mi (1,850 km^{2})
  - Water: 0.8 sq mi (2.1 km^{2}) 0.1%

Population (2020)
  - Total: 669
  - Estimate (2025): 639 ▼
  - Density: 0.938/sq mi (0.362/km^{2})
- Time zone: UTC−6 (Central)
  - Summer (DST): UTC−5 (CDT)
- Congressional district: 3rd
- Website: thomascountyne.gov

Thomas County is a county in the U.S. state of Nebraska, formed in 1887, named for General George H. Thomas. At the 2020 United States census the population was 669. Its county seat is Thedford.

In the Nebraska vehicle license plate system, Thomas County is represented by the prefix 89 (it had the eighty-ninth-largest number of vehicles registered in the state when the license plate system was established in 1922).

== Geography ==
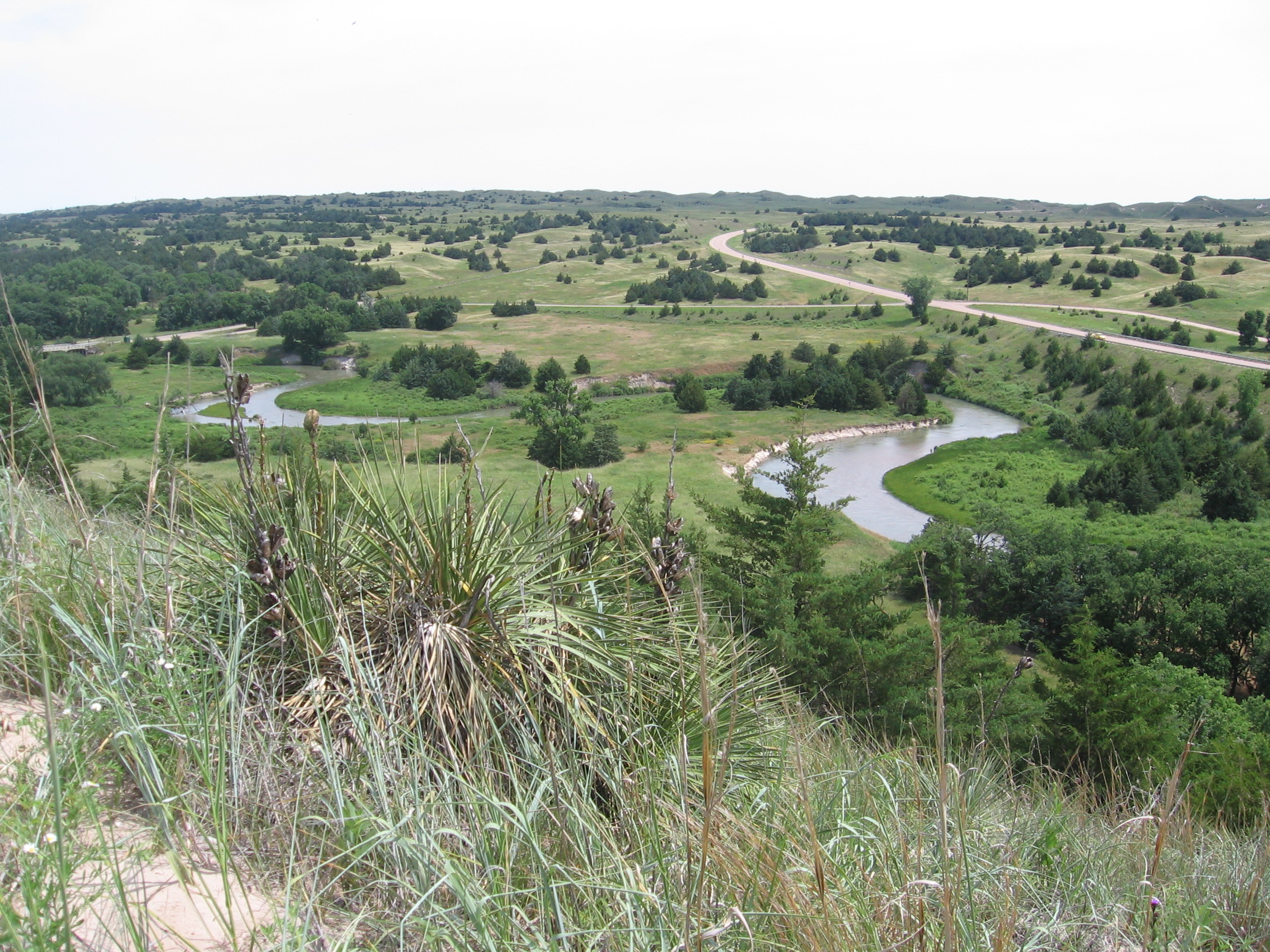
A view of the Dismal River, Sandhills, and U.S. Route 83 in Thomas County

The terrain of Thomas County consists of rolling hills, sloping to the east. The Middle Loup River flows east-southeastward through the middle of the county, and the Dismal River flows in the same direction through the lower part of the county. The two streams converge east of Thomas County. The county has an area of 714 square miles (1,850 km^{2}), of which 713 square miles (1,850 km^{2}) is land and 0.8 square miles (2.1 km^{2}) (0.1%) is water.

=== Major highways ===
- U.S. Highway 83
- Nebraska Highway 2

=== Adjacent counties ===
- Cherry County - north
- Blaine County - east
- Logan County - south
- McPherson County - southwest
- Hooker County - west

=== National protected area ===
- Nebraska National Forest (part)

== Demographics ==
Historical population
Census	Pop.	Note	%±
1890	517		—
1900	628		21.5%
1910	1,191		89.6%
1920	1,773		48.9%
1930	1,510		−14.8%
1940	1,553		2.8%
1950	1,206		−22.3%
1960	1,078		−10.6%
1970	954		−11.5%
1980	973		2.0%
1990	851		−12.5%
2000	729		−14.3%
2010	647		−11.2%
2020	669		3.4%
2025 (est.)	639	▼	−4.5%
US Decennial Census; 1790-1960 1900-1990; 1990-2000 2010 2020 2022

=== 2020 census ===
As of the 2020 census, the county had a population of 669. The median age was 47.8 years. 21.7% of residents were under the age of 18 and 29.0% of residents were 65 years of age or older. For every 100 females there were 107.8 males, and for every 100 females age 18 and over there were 102.3 males age 18 and over.

The racial makeup of the county was 94.2% White, 0.0% Black or African American, 0.6% American Indian and Alaska Native, 0.1% Asian, 0.0% Native Hawaiian and Pacific Islander, 0.6% from some other race, and 4.5% from two or more races. Hispanic or Latino residents of any race comprised 4.3% of the population.

0.0% of residents lived in urban areas, while 100.0% lived in rural areas.

There were 305 households in the county, of which 31.1% had children under the age of 18 living with them and 17.4% had a female householder with no spouse or partner present. About 27.9% of all households were made up of individuals and 13.5% had someone living alone who was 65 years of age or older.

There were 379 housing units, of which 19.5% were vacant. Among occupied housing units, 74.4% were owner-occupied and 25.6% were renter-occupied. The homeowner vacancy rate was 0.0% and the rental vacancy rate was 0.0%.

=== 2000 census ===
As of the 2000 United States census, there were 729 people, 325 households, and 216 families in the county. The population density was 1 person per square mile (0.39 person/km^{2}). There were 446 housing units at an average density of 0.6 units per square mile (0.23/km^{2}).

The racial makeup of the county was 99.45% White, 0.27% Native American, and 0.27% from two or more races. 0.82% of the population were Hispanic or Latino of any race.

There were 325 households, out of which 26.80% had children under the age of 18 living with them, 60.60% were married couples living together, 4.30% had a female householder with no husband present, and 33.50% were non-families. 31.40% of all households were made up of individuals, and 16.60% had someone living alone who was 65 years of age or older. The average household size was 2.24 and the average family size was 2.84.

The county population contained 23.60% under the age of 18, 4.40% from 18 to 24, 23.90% from 25 to 44, 27.80% from 45 to 64, and 20.30% who were 65 years of age or older. The median age was 44 years. For every 100 females there were 99.70 males. For every 100 females age 18 and over, there were 90.80 males.

The median income for a household in the county was $27,292, and the median income for a family was $36,618. Males had a median income of $25,662 versus $20,577 for females. The per capita income for the county was $15,335. About 13.60% of families and 14.30% of the population were below the poverty line, including 21.30% of those under age 18 and 17.30% of those age 65 or over.

== Communities ==
=== Villages ===
- Halsey (partial)
- Thedford (county seat)

=== Census-designated place ===
- Seneca

=== Unincorporated places ===
- Natick
- Norway

== Politics ==
Thomas County voters are reliably Republican. In no national election since 1936 has the county selected the Democratic Party candidate.

Thomas county is the only county outside of the confederacy and border south to vote for both Democrat John Davis is in his landslide loss as well as Republican Barry Goldwater in his, 40 years later.

United States presidential election results for Thomas County, Nebraska
Year	Republican		Democratic		Third party(ies)	
Year	No.	%	No.	%	No.	%
1900	65	43.62%	80	53.69%	4	2.68%
1904	86	60.56%	40	28.17%	16	11.27%
1908	95	40.60%	130	55.56%	9	3.85%
1912	86	22.28%	172	44.56%	128	33.16%
1916	244	45.78%	261	48.97%	28	5.25%
1920	305	55.86%	207	37.91%	34	6.23%
1924	206	35.46%	216	37.18%	159	27.37%
1928	406	72.24%	152	27.05%	4	0.71%
1932	262	36.34%	437	60.61%	22	3.05%
1936	366	48.61%	374	49.67%	13	1.73%
1940	486	63.70%	277	36.30%	0	0.00%
1944	338	61.23%	214	38.77%	0	0.00%
1948	312	56.73%	238	43.27%	0	0.00%
1952	490	80.33%	120	19.67%	0	0.00%
1956	422	77.72%	121	22.28%	0	0.00%
1960	420	74.87%	141	25.13%	0	0.00%
1964	319	60.08%	212	39.92%	0	0.00%
1968	354	76.79%	76	16.49%	31	6.72%
1972	397	84.47%	73	15.53%	0	0.00%
1976	343	73.29%	103	22.01%	22	4.70%
1980	306	76.12%	65	16.17%	31	7.71%
1984	298	79.68%	73	19.52%	3	0.80%
1988	383	82.19%	81	17.38%	2	0.43%
1992	283	60.34%	70	14.93%	116	24.73%
1996	303	70.63%	64	14.92%	62	14.45%
2000	329	83.29%	55	13.92%	11	2.78%
2004	378	85.14%	60	13.51%	6	1.35%
2008	331	84.87%	51	13.08%	8	2.05%
2012	360	88.24%	42	10.29%	6	1.47%
2016	344	87.53%	30	7.63%	19	4.83%
2020	377	88.29%	45	10.54%	5	1.17%
2024	348	88.55%	44	11.20%	1	0.25%

== See also ==
- National Register of Historic Places listings in Thomas County, Nebraska
