= USS Agawam (SP-570) =

United States Navy yacht

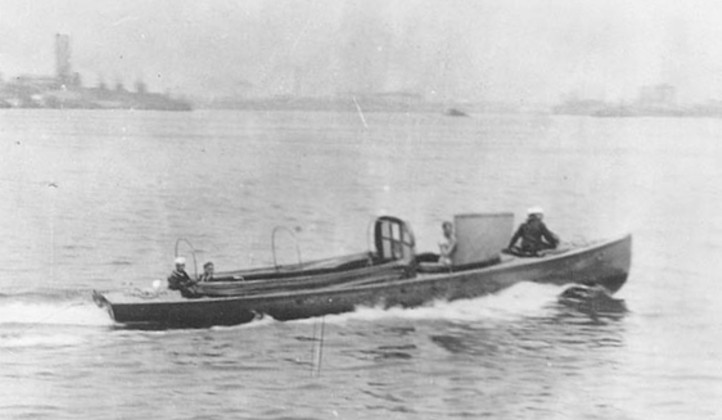
- USS Natick underway during World War I.

History

United States
- Name: USS Agawam
- Namesake: Agawam is an Indian word meaning lowland, marsh, or meadow. Natick is a town in Massachusetts.
- Owner: Richard T. Crane Jr. of Chicago, Illinois
- Builder: in England
- Acquired: April 1917
- Commissioned: October 1917
- Decommissioned: 1919 (est.)
- Renamed: USS Natick in August 1918
- Stricken: 1919 (est.)
- Home port: Great Lakes area
- Fate: Returned to her owner in August 1919
- Status: Unknown

General characteristics
- Type: motor patrol boat
- Displacement: 40 long tons (41 t)
- Length: 40 ft (12 m)
- Beam: 7 ft 6 in (2.29 m)
- Draft: 2 ft 6 in (0.76 m)
- Speed: 17 kn (20 mph; 31 km/h)
- Complement: 4 enlisted personnel
- Armament: Unknown

USS Agawam (SP-570) — later renamed as the USS Natick (SP-570) — was a yacht acquired during World War I by the United States Navy. She was employed by the Navy as a patrol boat in the Great Lakes and was returned to her owner when the war was over.

== Construction ==
USS Agawam was built in England. She was 40 feet (12 m) long, had a draft of 2 feet 6 inches (0.76 m), and displaced 50 tonnes (49 long tons; 55 short tons). She had a top speed of 17 knots (31 km/h; 20 mph), and a complement of four.

== Service history ==
Natick was acquired by the Navy on free lease from Richard T. Crane Jr. of Chicago, Illinois on 12 April 1917, then renamed Natick and commissioned on 20 October 1917. She was assigned as a patrol craft in the 9th Naval District during World War I. After wartime patrol duties, she was returned to her owner 15 August 1919.
