= Natick, Nebraska =

Unincorporated community in Nebraska, U.S.

Coordinates: 41°57′21″N 100°26′22″W

Natick is an unincorporated community in Thomas County, Nebraska, United States.

== History ==
Natick was established in the 1880s when the Chicago, Burlington and Quincy Railroad was extended to that point. It was likely named after Natick, Massachusetts. The first post office in Natick opened in 1887, and operated intermittently before closing in 1916.
