= Seneca, Nebraska =

Unincorporated community in Blaine County, Nebraska, United States

- Unincorporated community
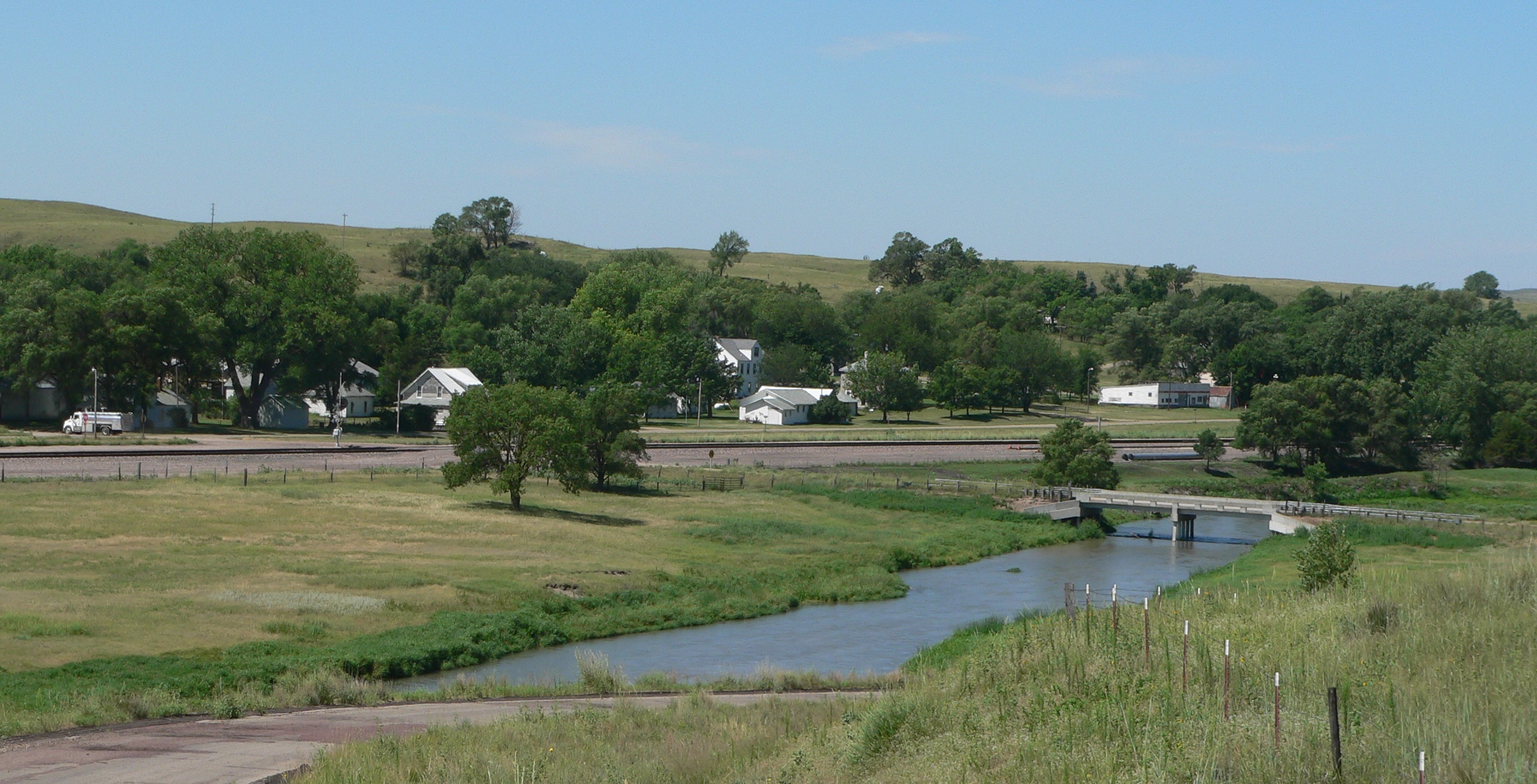
- Seneca seen from the southeast, across the Middle Loup River

- Location of Seneca, Nebraska
- Coordinates: 42°02′38″N 100°49′55″W
- Country: United States
- State: Nebraska
- County: Thomas

Area
  - Total: 0.29 sq mi (0.76 km^{2})
  - Land: 0.29 sq mi (0.76 km^{2})
  - Water: 0 sq mi (0.00 km^{2})
- Elevation: 2,969 ft (905 m)

Population (2020)
  - Total: 49
  - Density: 166.0/sq mi (64.09/km^{2})
- Time zone: UTC-6 (Central (CST))
  - Summer (DST): UTC-5 (CDT)
- ZIP code: 69161
- Area code: 308
- FIPS code: 31-44385
- GNIS feature ID: 2784110

Seneca is an unincorporated community in Thomas County, Nebraska in the Great Plains region of the United States. The population was 49 at the 2020 census.

Seneca was established on the Chicago, Burlington and Quincy Railroad in 1888. The location of a division point on the railroad, it was for some years the largest settlement in Thomas County. The population dwindled following the closing of the railroad roundhouse. In 2014, after a dispute on the village board, the residents voted to disincorporate the village.

== History ==
The Chicago, Burlington and Quincy Railroad was constructed along the Middle Loup River in the late 1880s. Construction was halted for the winter of 1887–88 in western Thomas County, and the town of Seneca was established at that point in January 1888.

Seneca became a division point on the railroad, with a depot, rail yard, and roundhouse, employing over 70 people. Railroad operations brought a measure of prosperity to the town, and promoted its growth. Between 1918 and 1923, the Potash Highway, running from Grand Island to Alliance, was constructed parallel to the Burlington's route; it ran through the center of Seneca. The town boasted a number of retail businesses, including hotels, banks, a lumberyard, a railroad cafe, and an automobile dealership. For some years, it was the largest municipality in Thomas County, reaching a peak population of 476 in 1920.

In 1926, the Potash Highway was reconfigured as Nebraska Highway 2. In the early 1940s, a re-alignment to reduce the number of railroad crossings shifted the highway to the south of Seneca. The railroad moved its operations out of the town, eliminating jobs and causing the loss of population and the closing of additional businesses.

In about 2013, a dispute arose over the village board's passage of an ordinance prohibiting the keeping of horses in the town. It gave rise to a petition to disincorporate Seneca. In May 2014, the residents voted 17–16 for disincorporation, and the village was disincorporated by the Thomas County Board at the end of June 2014.

== Geography ==
According to the United States Census Bureau, the village has a total area of 0.13 square miles (0.34 km^{2}), all land.

== Demographics ==
Historical population
Census	Pop.	Note	%±
1920	476		—
1930	272		−42.9%
1940	255		−6.2%
1950	219		−14.1%
1960	160		−26.9%
1970	111		−30.6%
1980	90		−18.9%
1990	78		−13.3%
2000	51		−34.6%
2010	33		−35.3%
2020	49		48.5%
U.S. Decennial Census

=== 2000 census ===
As of the census of 2000, there were 51 people, 26 households, and 17 families residing in the village. The population density was 422.8 inhabitants per square mile (163.2/km^{2}). There were 52 housing units at an average density of 431.1 per square mile (166.4/km^{2}). The racial makeup of the village was 100.00% White.

There were 26 households, out of which 23.1% had children under the age of 18 living with them, 50.0% were married couples living together, 15.4% had a female householder with no husband present, and 34.6% were non-families. 34.6% of all households were made up of individuals, and 23.1% had someone living alone who was 65 years of age or older. The average household size was 1.96 and the average family size was 2.47.

The median age in Seneca was 48 years: 19.6% of the residents were under the age of 18; 2.0% were aged from 18 to 24; 19.6% were between 25 and 44; 35.3% were from 45 to 64; and 23.5% were 65 years of age or older. For every 100 females, there were 75.9 males. For every 100 females age 18 and over, there were 64.0 males.

As of 2000, the median income for a household in the village was $20,833 and the median income for a family was $21,667. Males had a median income of $26,250 versus $20,500 for females. The per capita income for the village was $15,803. The village population included 12.1% who lived below the poverty line. That included 16.7% of the families and 23.1% of residents older than 64, but no one younger than 18.

=== 2010 census ===
As of the census of 2010, there were 33 people, 21 households, and 10 families residing in the village. The population density was 253.8 inhabitants per square mile (98.0/km^{2}). There were 46 housing units at an average density of 353.8 per square mile (136.6/km^{2}). The racial makeup of the village was 100.0% White.

There were 21 households, of which 2 had children under the age of 18 living with them, 8 were married couples living together, 1 had a female householder with no husband present, 1 had a male householder with no wife present, and 11 were non-families. Eleven of the households were made up of individuals, and 8 had someone living alone who was 65 years of age or older. The average household size was 1.57 and the average family size was 2.10.

The median age in the village was 55.3 years. Three of the residents were under the age of 18; one was between the ages of 18 and 24; four were between 25 and 44; fifteen were from 45 to 64; and ten were 65 years of age or older. The gender makeup of the village was 45.5% male and 54.5% female.
