= Project Natick =

Experimental underwater data center program

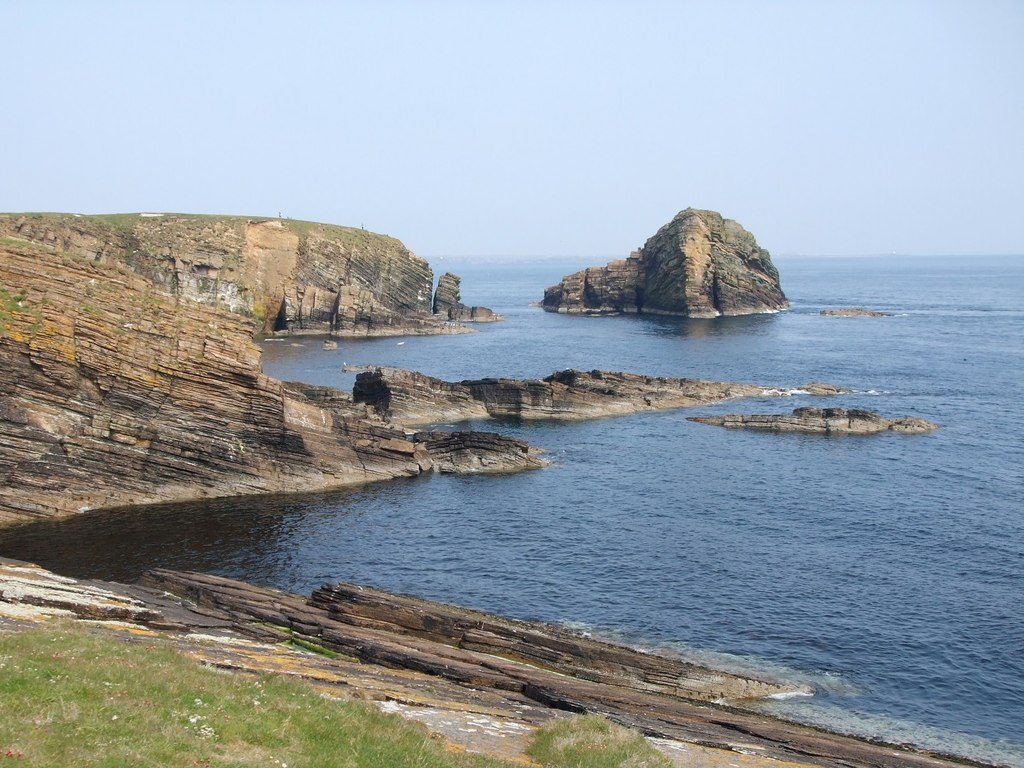
The coast of Orkney Islands, where the Phase II Vessel for Project Natick was deployed

Project Natick was a research and development effort by Microsoft to create an experimental undersea data center (UDC). The company deployed its first prototype in August 2015. It subsequently deployed and retrieved a "shipping-container-sized" data center off the coast of the Northern Isles in 2018. Microsoft subcontracted Naval Group to spearhead the design and manufacture of the vessel.

In 2024, Microsoft said that Project Natick was no longer active.

== History ==
In 2013, a Microsoft employee with previous experience in the US Navy suggested that an underwater server farm could cut on cooling costs and increase environmental sustainability. A group of employees wrote and circulated a white paper to promote the idea.

=== Phase I ===
In late 2014, the project was launched with a meeting in Redmond, Washington. The first prototype was named Leona Philpot (after a character from the Xbox video game series Halo) and was deployed off the coast of California on August 10, 2015. The prototype was placed 30 feet underwater. The trial lasted 105 days and the prototype was successfully lifted out of the water for further testing. Following the initial experiment, Microsoft wanted the next prototype to be larger in size, deployed in harsher conditions, and powered with renewable energy.

=== Phase II ===
Microsoft invited a group of marine organizations to submit proposals to realize the second phase of the project. Naval Group, a French defense contractor, was selected to lead in the design and deployment of the project. The Natick Phase 2 vessel was deployed on June 1, 2018, off the coast of Orkney. The vessel stayed underwater for over two years, connected to the Orkney power grid. After the start of the COVID-19 pandemic, the undersea data center was employed to process workloads for vaccine research via Folding@home. In July 2020, the vessel was successfully lifted out of the water and retrieved for analysis.

=== Termination ===
By 2024, Project Natick had been inactive for several years, though it was referenced in media as though it was ongoing. That year, Microsoft confirmed that the project was inactive and that it had no servers underwater.

== Impact ==
Project Natick was nominated for the Scottish Renewables Carbon Reduction Award in 2018. Additionally, the project showed that 864 servers could run reliably for two years with cooling provided by sea water at its natural temperature. A United States Department of Energy report used Project Natick as an example of how "marine energy combined with storage and potentially other renewable energy sources could provide the power or partial power for [data centers]."

=== Underwater data centers in China ===
The first commercial underwater data center (UDC) was launched off Hainan Island, China in 2023 by HiCloud Technology.

The Shanghai Lingang UDC complex—jointly-owned by HiCloud and China Communications Construction—and launched in May 2026, is the first to be wind-powered.

Both UDC's align with China's 2025 Energy Law, which establishes a framework for low-carbon transition and mandates the consumption of non-fossil fuel energy.
