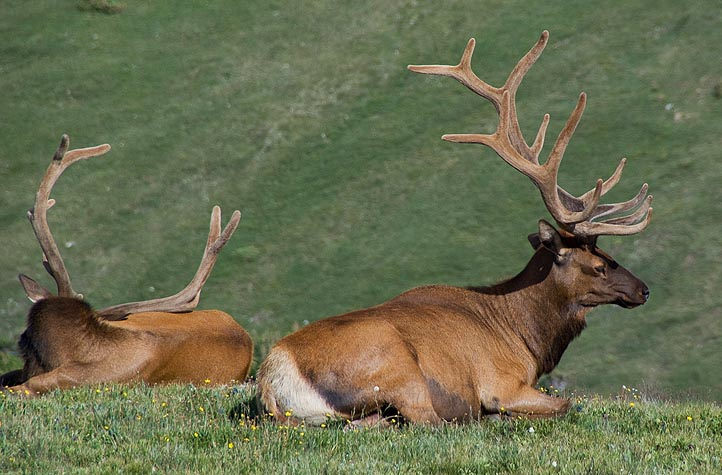
- Male Rocky Mountain elk
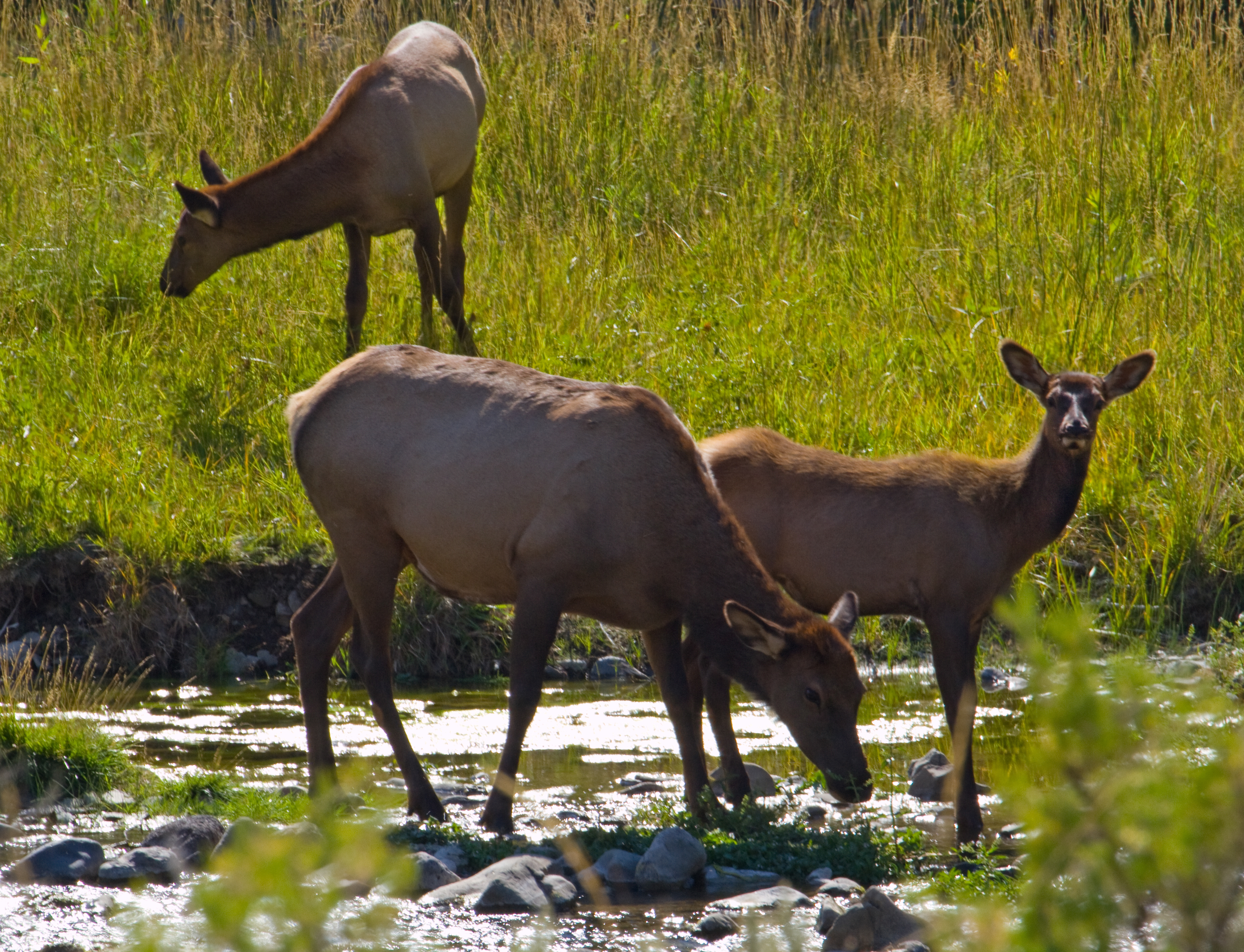
- Female Rocky Mountain elk

Conservation status
- Secure (NatureServe)

Scientific classification
- Kingdom: Animalia
- Phylum: Chordata
- Class: Mammalia
- Order: Artiodactyla
- Family: Cervidae
- Genus: Cervus
- Species: C. canadensis
- Subspecies: C. c. nelsoni

Trinomial name
- Cervus canadensis nelsoni (Erxleben, 1777)

Synonyms
- Cervus elaphus nelsoni

= Rocky Mountain elk =

Subspecies of deer

The Rocky Mountain elk (Cervus canadensis nelsoni) is a subspecies of elk found in the Rocky Mountains and adjacent ranges of Western North America.

== Description ==
The Rocky Mountain elk is the second largest animal in the elk subfamily, behind the Roosevelt elk native to the Pacific Northwest. The elk ranges from 230–340 kg (500–750 lb), depending on male or female. Males are about 2.4 m (7.9 ft) in length and females are about 2 m (6.6 ft). Males stand at about 1.5 m (4.9 ft) in height and females at about 1.3 m (4.3 ft). They tend to be larger in size and have a brown coloration. The Rocky Mountain elk has a rump which is lighter in color than the rest of the body. These "white rumps" were named by the Shawnee granting the name "Wapiti" to the elks. During the summer, the elk develops a light more auburn colored coat. Overall, the Rocky Mountain elk displays a dark head color paired with a lighter body color.

== Habitat ==
The winter ranges are most common in open forests and floodplain marshes in the lower elevations. In the summer it migrates to the subalpine forests and alpine basins. This elk has a diverse habitat range, but is most often found in forest and forest edge habitat and in mountain regions it often stays in higher elevations during warmer months and migrates down lower in the winter. It may even come down the mountain and leave the forest into some grassland for part of the day but head back into the timber in the evening.

=== Effects of climate change ===
Climate change/warming can keep this elk in its higher elevation habitats for longer into the winter than normal. Climate changes such as warming have in some cases even increased the seasonal range of elk in the winter. For example, in Yellowstone the climate warming has kept the snow at a lower level than in the past and has given the elk the ability to populate higher ranges than before. The lack of snow in Yellowstone has also given the elk an advantage over the grey wolf in their predator prey relationship because the wolf relies on deep snow to hunt the elk in winter ranges of Yellowstone. The total wild population is about one million individuals.

== Behavior ==
=== Diet ===
The Rocky Mountain elk is an herbivore that changes its diet based on the season. During the winter season, 84% of its diet dependeds on grasses and shrubs. The breakdown of the elk's diet is 65% grasses, 15% shrubbery, 5% mosses and lichens, and 2% forbs.

=== Reproduction ===
Calves to cows ratios have been steadily declining by 80% every year. The decline has resulted from human activities that affected the lives of the Rocky Mountain elk. Older Rocky Mountain elk help produce more successful offspring and females carry offspring for shorter timespans. Males who are older help females conceive earlier than females mating with younger males. Comparably conception of offspring is one week earlier. Nutrition of females affects the success of the offspring.

=== Hunting ===
It has been shown that human hunting has affected the elk's reproductive success. The hunting of elk increases behavioral changes in females causing the elk to lose valuable resources needed. During the day when the elk would normally be foraging for food, during hunting season the elk will intentionally avoid foraging and avoid any type of roads or trails that hunters may follow. The change of foraging and lack of resources leads to malnutrition and loss of body fat.

== Conservation ==
=== Colorado ===
The Rocky Mountain elk was reintroduced in 1913 to Colorado from Wyoming after the near extinction of the regional herds. While overhunting is a significant contributing factor, the elk's near extinction is mainly attributed to human encroachment and destruction of their natural habitats and migratory corridors. A year later, twenty-one elk from Jackson Hole, Wyoming were reintroduced to South Dakota's Wind Cave National Park for population increase. Conservation efforts also brought the elk populations in New Mexico from near-zero numbers in the late 1800s and early 1900s, to healthy populations in the 1930s in Northern New Mexico.

=== Nebraska ===
Population numbers of elk in Nebraska continued to increase through the 1970s and 1980s, to a level in which complaints from landowners in the Pine Ridge region led to the implementation of relatively liberal hunting seasons in the late 1980s. Elk numbers continued to increase through the 1990s to the present.

=== Washington ===
All Rocky Mountain elk in Washington are the result of reintroductions conducted in the early 1900s from Yellowstone elk herds. These initial reintroductions have expanded their range and have also been translocated within the State. Not all of these elk have all the habitat to be successful in large numbers; supplemental feeding programs are used to compensate for lost winter range .

=== Eastern U.S. ===
==== Pennsylvania ====
72 Rocky Mountain elk were introduced into Pennsylvania in 1913, replacing the extinct eastern elk. Introductions continued for several decades, but legal and illegal hunting from the 1930s to the 1970s kept the state's population between 24 and 70 individuals. With improved research and management by the Pennsylvania Game Commission in the late 1970s, the population began to increase. The herd has continued to increase, and numbered approximately 1,350 individuals by 2020. They are legally hunted through strict permitting, and have also generated a local ecotourism industry.

==== Kentucky ====
In recent years, elk from Utah have been used to reestablish a population in Kentucky.

==== West Virginia ====
In 2018, elk from Arizona were transported to West Virginia to help with reestablishing the population there. Unfortunately, a parasite, brainworm, has killed off some of the herd.

==== Other states ====
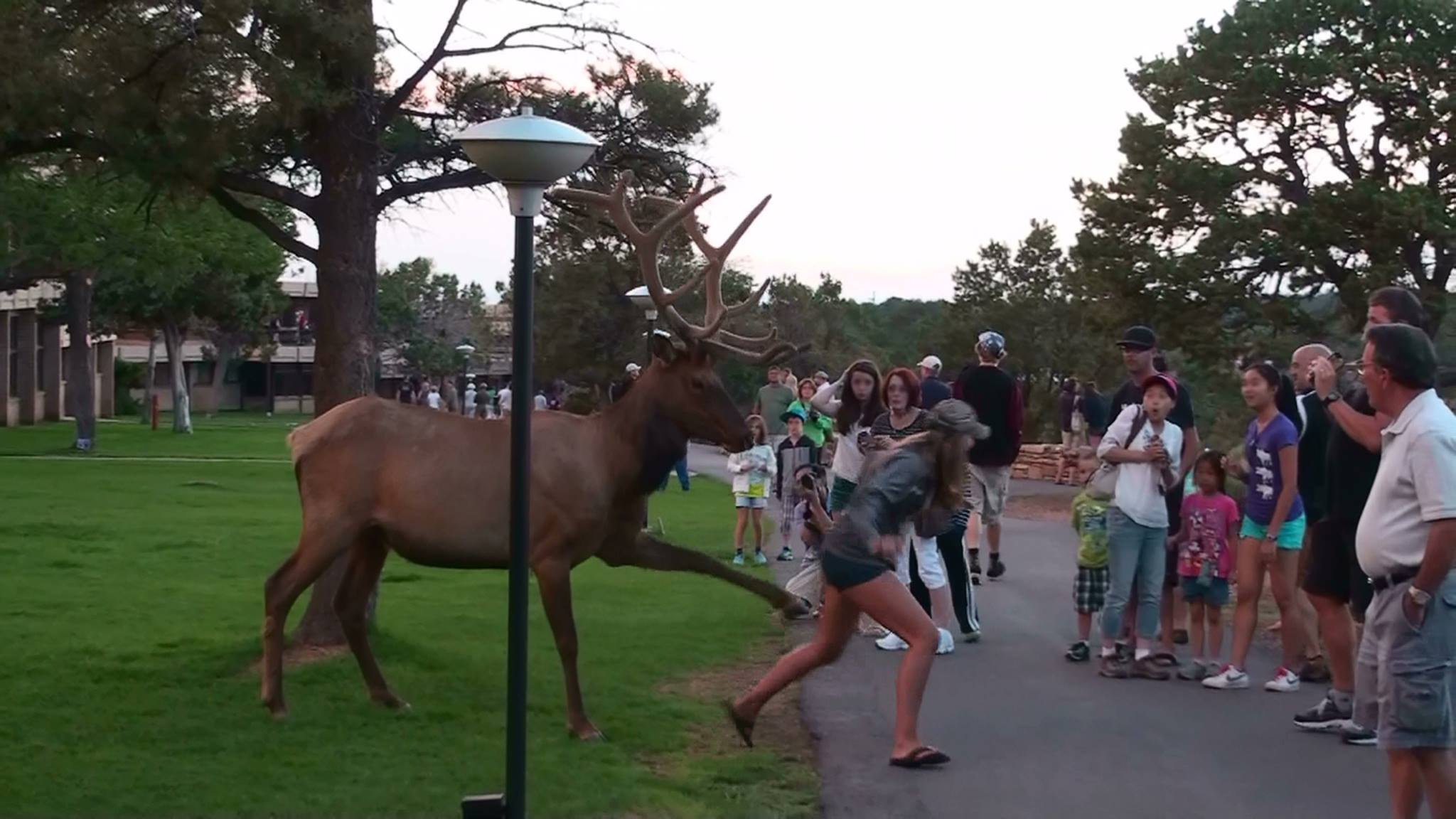
An interaction with visitors to Grand Canyon National Park in Arizona, 2013

In 1990, feasibility studies were conducted to determine if wild, free-ranging elk still had a place in some of their former eastern habitats. Once this was complete, healthy source herds of Rocky Mountain elk from Arizona, Kansas, New Mexico, North Dakota, Oregon, and Utah were used to introduce this elk subspecies to the former range of the extinct eastern elk.

=== Canada ===
Their populated Canadian ranges occur in Alberta's Jasper and Banff National Parks as well as British Columbia's Kootenay and Yoho National Parks.

== Chronic wasting disease ==
As of 2010, the Rocky Mountain elk herd was diagnosed with a serious disorder called chronic wasting disease (CWD). CWD affects the brain tissue of infected elk and is similar in symptoms to bovine spongiform encephalopathy (BSE), commonly known as mad-cow disease (MCD). There is no evidence to conclude that elk CWD is transmittable to humans, and research concerning CWD and its effect on the eco-system continues. Environmental and CWD problems in Estes Park, Colorado, and, on a greater scale, throughout the western North America have governmental policy makers searching for solutions.

== Hoof disease ==
Hoof disease, known as Treponeme-associated hoof disease (TAHD), leads to the progression of lesions, ulcers, and possible complete loss of hoof capsule on elk's hooves. Over time the disease leads to lameness, deterioration of body condition, eventually leading to death. The disease is spread from elks walking over contaminated areas that a diseased elk recently has walked through. It is known that environmental factors cause hoof disease in elk; it is unknown whether genetics has a role in its development. Studies conducted during 2016 to 2018 found Rocky Mountain Elk with unsymmetrical antlers are more common to have hoof disease.
