= Halsey, Nebraska =

Village in Nebraska, US

- Village
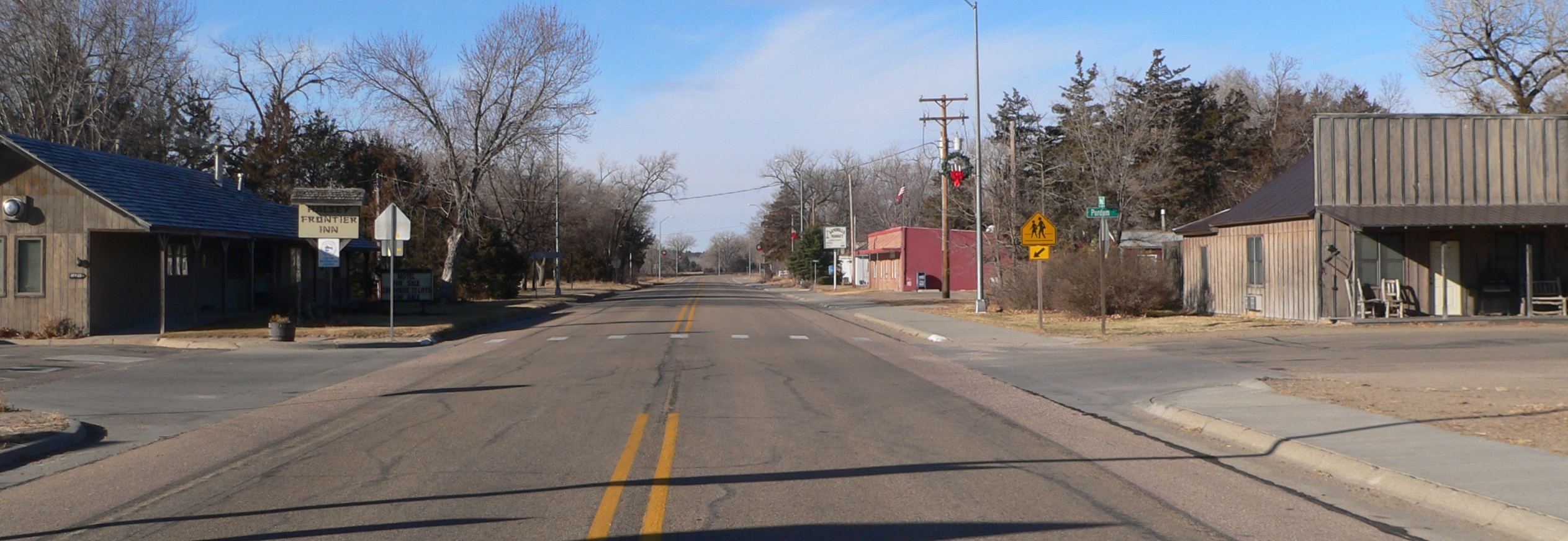
- Halsey, looking westward along Nebraska Highway 2

- Location of Halsey, Nebraska
- Coordinates: 41°54′12″N 100°16′11″W
- Country: United States
- State: Nebraska
- Counties: Thomas, Blaine

Area
  - Total: 0.19 sq mi (0.50 km^{2})
  - Land: 0.19 sq mi (0.50 km^{2})
  - Water: 0 sq mi (0.00 km^{2})
- Elevation: 2,700 ft (820 m)

Population (2020)
  - Total: 68
  - Density: 351.4/sq mi (135.67/km^{2})
- Time zone: UTC-6 (Central (CST))
  - Summer (DST): UTC-5 (CDT)
- ZIP code: 69142
- Area code: 308
- FIPS code: 31-20680
- GNIS feature ID: 2398226

Halsey is a village in Blaine and Thomas counties in Nebraska, United States. As of the 2020 census, Halsey had a population of 68.

== History ==
Halsey was established in 1887 when the railroad was extended to that point. It was named for Halsey Yates, a railroad employee.

== Geography ==
Halsey is located at 41°54′9″N 100°16′5″W (41.902625, -100.268114), mostly in Thomas County.

According to the United States Census Bureau, the village has a total area of 0.19 square miles (0.49 km^{2}), all land.

== Demographics ==
Historical population
Census	Pop.	Note	%±
1960	111		—
1970	131		18.0%
1980	144		9.9%
1990	110		−23.6%
2000	59		−46.4%
2010	76		28.8%
2020	68		−10.5%
U.S. Decennial Census; 2012 Estimate

=== 2010 census ===
As of the census of 2010, there were 76 people, 35 households, and 24 families residing in the village. The population density was 400.0 inhabitants per square mile (154.4/km^{2}). There were 52 housing units at an average density of 273.7 per square mile (105.7/km^{2}). The racial makeup of the village was 93.4% White, 1.3% Asian, and 5.3% from two or more races.

There were 35 households, of which 22.9% had children under the age of 18 living with them, 57.1% were married couples living together, 5.7% had a female householder with no husband present, 5.7% had a male householder with no wife present, and 31.4% were non-families. 28.6% of all households were made up of individuals, and 14.3% had someone living alone who was 65 years of age or older. The average household size was 2.17 and the average family size was 2.63.

The median age in the village was 54.8 years. 22.4% of residents were under the age of 18; 1.3% were between the ages of 18 and 24; 11.8% were from 25 to 44; 39.4% were from 45 to 64; and 25% were 65 years of age or older. The gender makeup of the village was 46.1% male and 53.9% female.

=== 2000 census ===
As of the census of 2000, there were 59 people, 34 households, and 17 families residing in the village. The population density was 299.0 people per square mile (115.4 people/km^{2}). There were 52 housing units at an average density of 263.5 per square mile (101.7/km^{2}). The racial makeup of the village was 100.00% White.

There were 34 households, out of which 14.7% had children under the age of 18 living with them, 50.0% were married couples living together, 2.9% had a female householder with no husband present, and 47.1% were non-families. 47.1% of all households were made up of individuals, and 23.5% had someone living alone who was 65 years of age or older. The average household size was 1.74 and the average family size was 2.39.

In the village, the population was spread out, with 11.9% under the age of 18, 3.4% from 18 to 24, 18.6% from 25 to 44, 35.6% from 45 to 64, and 30.5% who were 65 years of age or older. The median age was 54 years. For every 100 females, there were 73.5 males. For every 100 females age 18 and over, there were 73.3 males.

As of 2000 the median income for a household in the village was $21,250, and the median income for a family was $44,167. Males had a median income of $12,083 versus $0 for females. The per capita income for the village was $20,144. There were 25.0% of families and 19.2% of the population living below the poverty line, including no under eighteens and 26.1% of those over 64.

== See also ==
- List of municipalities in Nebraska
