= Northwestern Great Plains =

Ecoregion in the Northwestern Great Plains, United States

- Level III
- Prairie in Dakota Prairie Grasslands

- Level III ecoregions in the northwestern corner of the great plains, with the Northwestern Great Plains ecoregion marked as 43

Ecology
- Realm: Nearctic
- Biome: Temperate Grassland
- Borders: List: Northwestern Glaciated Plains; High Plains; Nebraska Sandhills; Middle Rockies; Wyoming Basin

Geography
- Country: United States
- State: Montana; North Dakota; South Dakota; Nebraska; Wyoming
- Climate type: Primarily Cold semi-arid (BSk)

The Northwestern Great Plains is a Level III Ecoregion designated by the United States Environmental Protection Agency (EPA). Located in the United States, It is subdivided up into 24 Level IV Ecoregions.

== Setting ==
The ecoregion is located across eastern Montana, southwest North Dakota, western South Dakota, northeastern Wyoming, and extends slightly into northern Nebraska. Terrain here varies greatly between steep badlands and flat prairies, with buttes dotting the landscape. Ranching is the main use of land here. Cropland is limited due to the unpredictable rainfall and limited groundwater.

== Climate ==
The climate is almost entirely semi-arid, but pockets of humid-continental exist in the eastern portions and around higher elevation areas. Precipitation varies seasonally, with winters being dry and a rainy season peaking in May to June.

Rocky mountain juniper in Sweet Grass County, Montana

== Flora ==
Flora here has adapted to the arid environment. Native grasses include blue grama (Bouteloua gracilis), green needle grass (Nassella viridula), western wheatgrass (Pascopyrum smithii), and buffalo grass (Bouteloua dactyloides). The region can only sustain a small amount of trees due to the low amount of water present. Trees like the rocky mountain juniper (Juniperus scopulorum) and eastern cottonwood (Populus deltoides) appear in the ecoregion.

Mule deer in South Dakota

== Fauna ==
Many of the animals located here are mammals who graze on the various grasses. Mule deer and white-tailed deer fall into this category. Pronghorn populations have made a stark recovery since the early 20th century, largely in part due to conservation efforts. The American bison, once a dominant force, have been almost entirely extirpated from the ecoregion. Only a limited number remain in protected areas. Black-tailed prairie dogs alter the landscape by building burrows for tasks like storing food or caring for the young. Carnivores like bobcats and coyotes hunt prey here. Birds also play a part in this ecoregion. American robins, Canadian geese, and western meadowlarks the primary birds present here. Herpetofauna like the American bullfrog, western fence lizard, and western painted turtle inhabit the ecoregion.

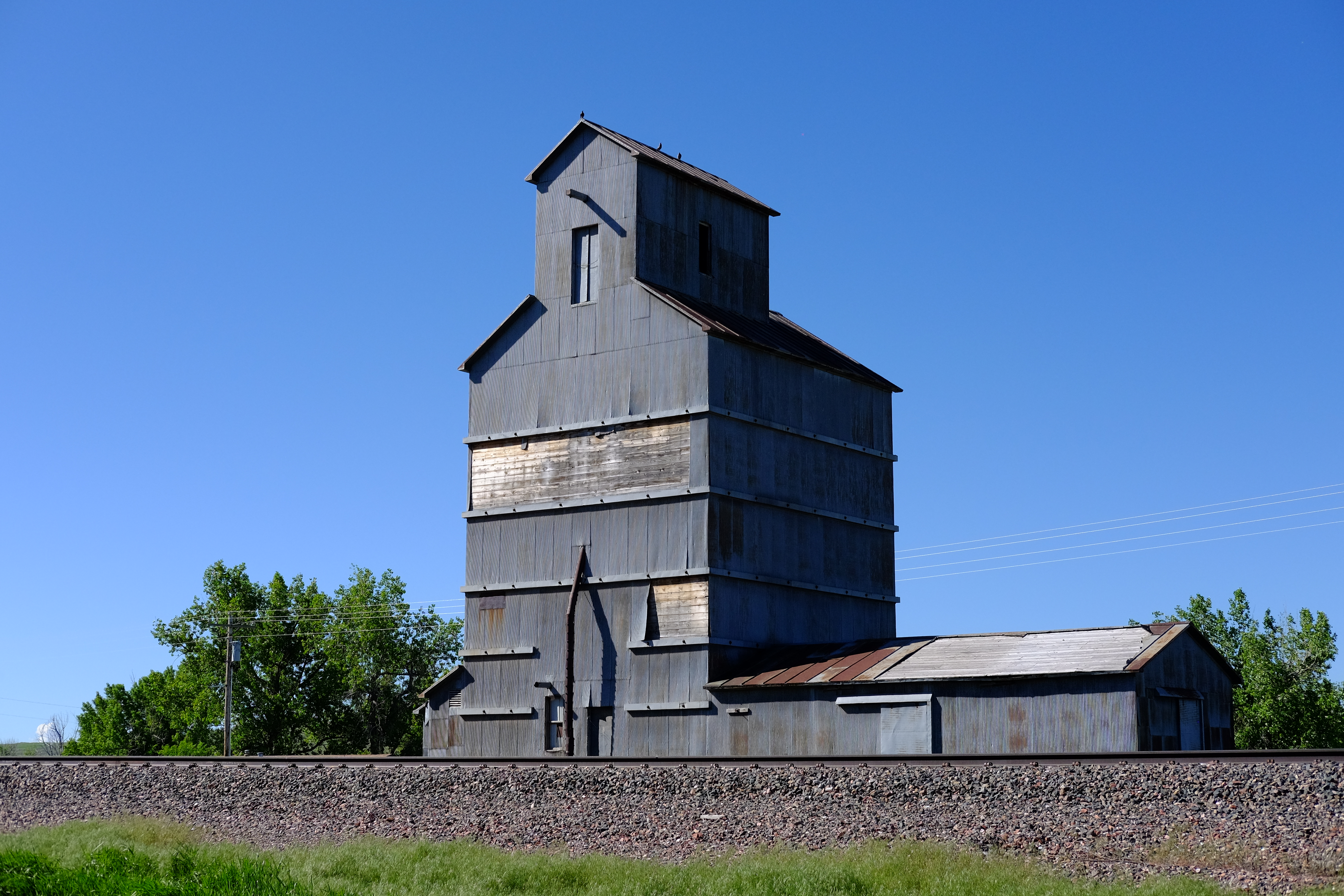
Grain Elevator in Moorcroft, Wyoming

== Human use ==
Before European colonization indigenous people like the Crow regularly burned the prairies to encourage new growth. This new growth attracted bison and other animals, who were hunted for materials. Post European-settlement, much of the land is used for cattle ranching. The most common crops here are wheat, alfalfa, and barley. Grain elevators are a common sighting because of this. Human settlement is limited due to the climate, but the largest city is Billings, Montana. Standing Rock Sioux Reservation, Crow Indian Reservation, and Cheyenne River Indian Reservation are prominent Indian reservations located within the ecoregion.

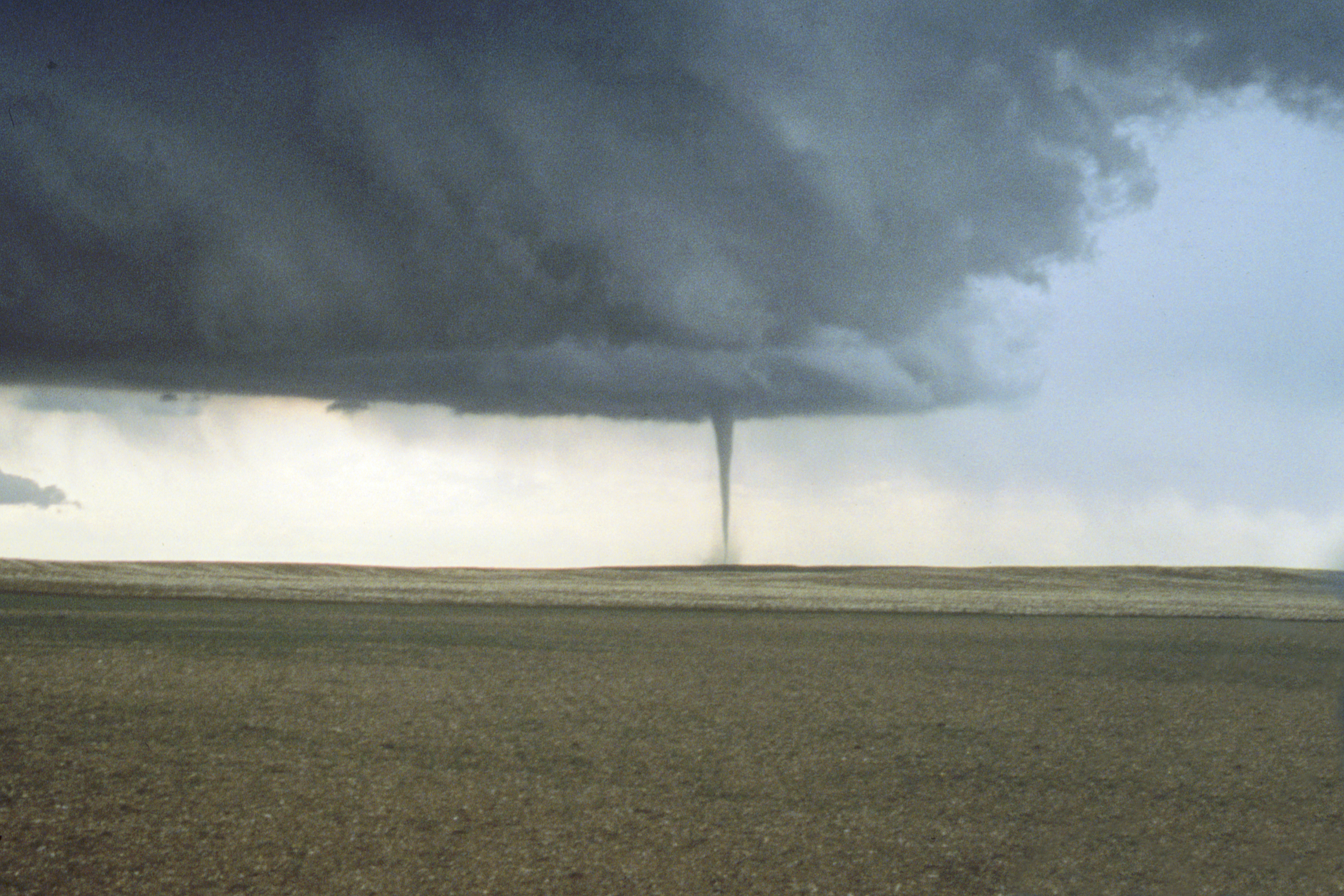
Tornado in Carbon County, Montana

== Conservation and threats ==
Very little unaltered landscape remains in the ecoregion. However, due to the nature of cattle ranching, there is high potential for recovery as most of the dominant flora is still native growth. There are many protected areas, like Medicine Rocks State Park, Oglala National Grassland, and Badlands National Park. With Climate change continuing, this region is in danger. In some regions of Montana and the Dakotas the average annual temperature has risen by as much as 5.5 °F in the past century. Natural disasters such as droughts, tornadoes and storms are expected to become more common.

== Level IV ecoregions ==
This ecoregion is subdivided into 24 level IV ecoregions:

- Missouri Plateau (42a)
- Little Missouri Badlands (42b)
- River Breaks (42c)
- Forested Buttes (42d)
- Sagebrush Steppe (42e)
- Subhumid Pierre Shale Plains (42f)
- Semiarid Pierre Shale Plains (42g)
- White River Badlands (42h)
- Keya Paha Tablelands (42i)
- Moreau Prairie (42j)
- Dense Clay Prairie (42k)
- Missouri Breaks Woodland-Shrubland (42l)
- Judith Basin Grassland (42m)
- Montana Central Grasslands (42n)
- Unglaciated Montana High Plains (42o)
- Pine Scoria Hills (42p)
- Mesic Dissected Plains (42q)
- Niobrara River Breaks (42r)
- Non-Calcareous Foothill Grassland (42s)
- Shield-Smith Valle (42t)
- Limy Foothill Grassland (42u)
- Pryor-Bighorn Foothills (42v)
- Powder River Basin (42w)
- Casper Arch (42x)

== Gallery ==
Medicine Rocks State Park, Montana

Cedar River National Grassland, North Dakota

Pinnacle Overlook at Badlands National Park, South Dakota

Black-tailed prairie dog, Wyoming

Young pronghorn in Oglala National Grassland, Nebraska

== See also ==
- List of ecoregions in the United States (EPA)
