= National grassland =

Classification of protected and managed federal lands

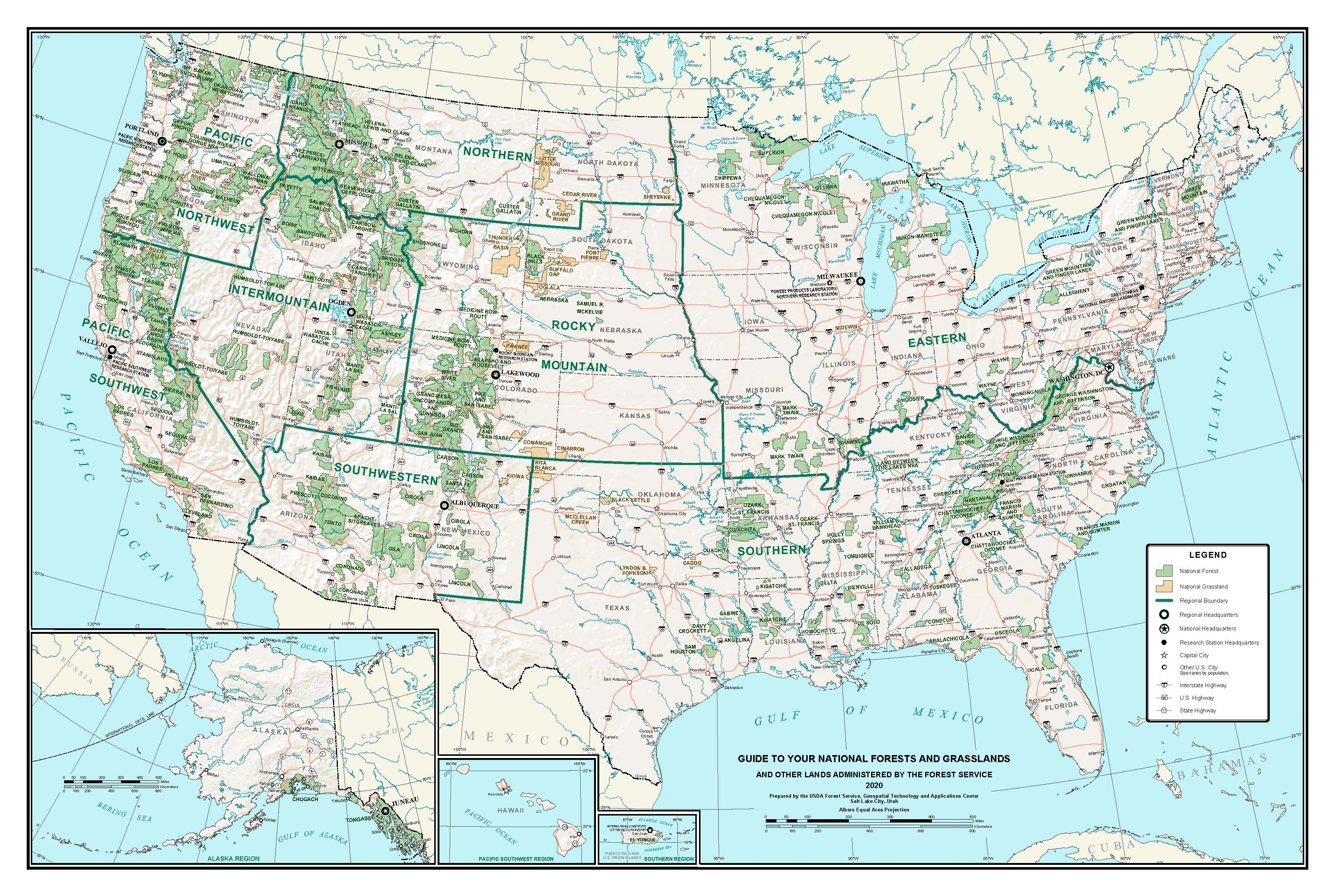
Map of national grasslands in the United States, depicted in yellow

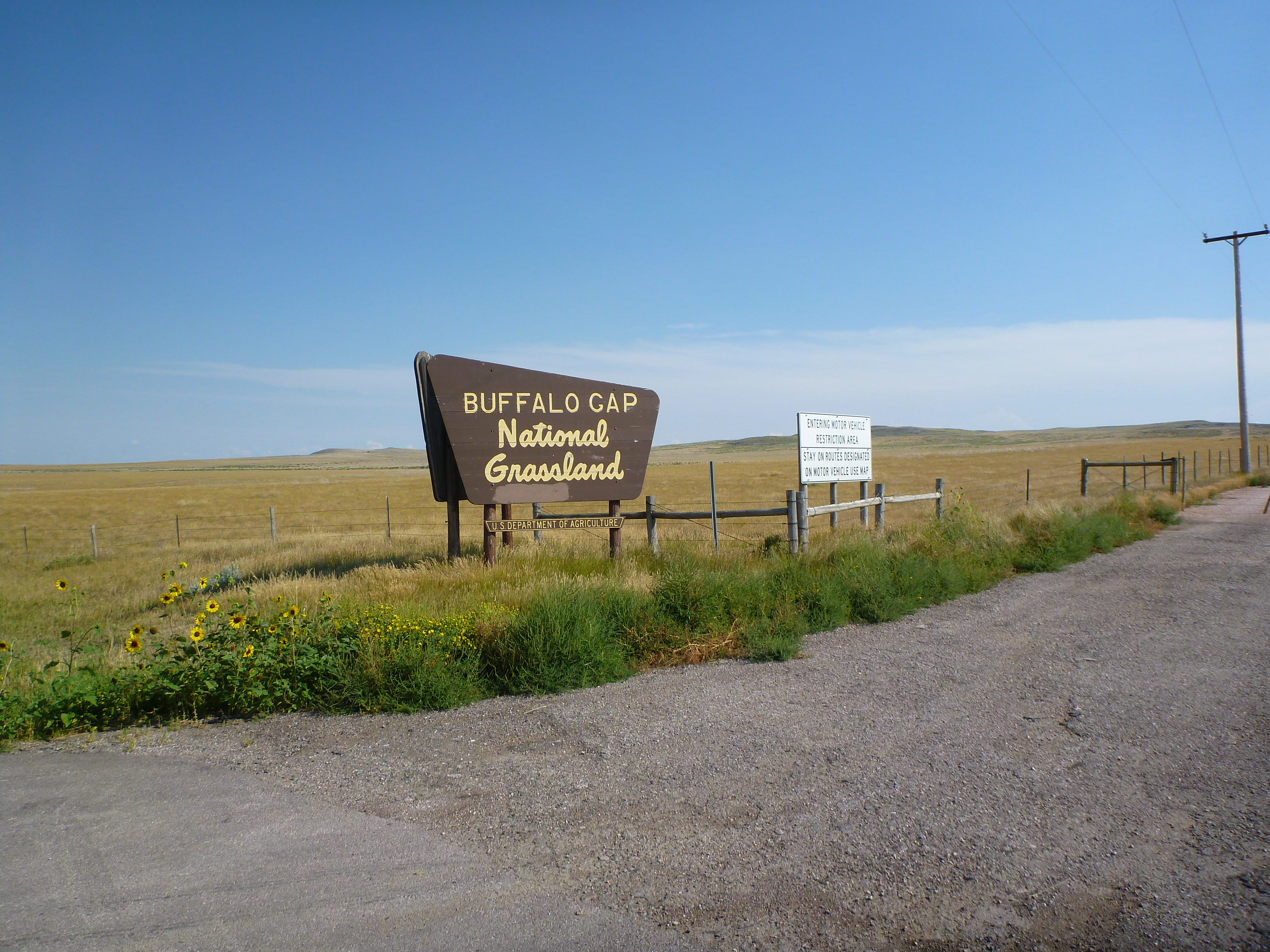
Entrance sign of a United States National Grassland area in South Dakota

A national grassland is an area of protected and managed federal lands in the United States authorized by Title III of the Bankhead–Jones Farm Tenant Act of 1937 and managed by the United States Forest Service. For administrative purposes, they are essentially identical to national forests, except that grasslands are areas primarily consisting of prairie. Like national forests, national grasslands may be open for hunting, grazing, mineral extraction, recreation and other uses. Various national grasslands are typically administered in conjunction with nearby national forests.

All but four national grasslands are on or at the edge of the Great Plains. Those four are in southeastern Idaho, northeastern California, central Oregon, and a reserve in Illinois. The three national grasslands in North Dakota, together with one in northwestern South Dakota, are administered jointly as the Dakota Prairie Grasslands. National grasslands are generally much smaller than national forests – while a typical national forest would be about 1,000,000 acres (400,000 ha), the average size of a national grassland is 191,914 acres (77,665 ha). The largest, the Little Missouri National Grassland in North Dakota, covers 1,028,784 acres (416,334 ha), which is approximately the median size of a national forest. As of September 30, 2007, the total area of all 20 national grasslands was 3,838,280 acres (1,553,300 ha).

== Soil Conservation Service ==
The catastrophic Dust Bowl of the 1930s led to the creation of the Soil Conservation Service in 1933. This and subsequent federal laws paved the way for establishing national grasslands.

== List ==
Name	Photo	Location	Administered by	Area	Description
Black Kettle		Oklahoma, Texas; 35°41′01″N 99°45′47″W	Cibola National Forest	31,286 acres (126.6 km^{2})	Black Kettle has sandy red slate hills as well as grassland and oak brush. There are three developed recreation areas, and the Washita River flows through the grassland.
Buffalo Gap		South Dakota; 43°26′15″N 103°03′02″W	Nebraska National Forests	595,715 acres (2,410.8 km^{2})	There are mixed prairie and badlands in Buffalo Gap as well as a reintroduced population of black-footed ferrets.
Butte Valley		California; 41°53′57″N 122°01′31″W	Klamath National Forest	18,425 acres (74.6 km^{2})	Formed July 1991, Butte Valley is the most recent National Grassland. It contains Meiss Lake and views of the Cascade Range.
Caddo		Texas; 33°43′56″N 95°57′29″W	National Forests and Grasslands in Texas	17,873 acres (72.3 km^{2})	Caddo is divided into two units and has two developed recreation areas around Lake Davy Crockett.
Cedar River		North Dakota; 45°57′19″N 101°48′24″W	Dakota Prairie Grasslands	6,717 acres (27.2 km^{2})	Cedar River is within the Standing Rock Sioux Reservation and has rolling hills and ephemeral streams.
Cimarron		Kansas; 37°08′18″N 101°46′56″W	Pike and San Isabel National Forests	108,176 acres (437.8 km^{2})	Cimarron has shortgrass prairie with cottonwood groves along the Cimarron River.
Comanche		Colorado; 37°20′12″N 103°04′26″W	Pike and San Isabel National Forests	443,081 acres (1,793.1 km^{2})	There are not only prairies in Comanche, but also canyons, including Picture Canyon.
Crooked River		Oregon; 44°32′36″N 121°06′34″W	Deschutes and Ochoco National Forests	112,357 acres (454.7 km^{2})	Crooked River contains two National Wild and Scenic Rivers: the Deschutes and Crooked rivers.
Curlew		Idaho; 42°11′15″N 112°41′57″W	Caribou-Targhee National Forest	47,790 acres (193.4 km^{2})	In southern Idaho, Curlew provides habitat for sage grouse while the Sweeten Pond area supports waterfowl and shorebirds.
Fort Pierre		South Dakota; 44°08′27″N 100°16′45″W	Nebraska National Forests	115,890 acres (469.0 km^{2})	Located south of Pierre and Fort Pierre, South Dakota, The Fort Pierre grassland includes several ponds open to fishing and dispersed camping.
Grand River		South Dakota; 45°44′09″N 102°21′40″W	Dakota Prairie Grasslands	154,783 acres (626.4 km^{2})	In addition to prairie, there are a variety of ecosystems and landforms in Grand River, including sand dunes, river bottoms, badlands, buttes, and sandstone outcroppings.
Kiowa		New Mexico; 36°10′00″N 104°10′02″W	Cibola National Forest	137,131 acres (554.9 km^{2})	Kiowa consists of two units in northeastern New Mexico and includes canyons along the Canadian River.
Little Missouri		North Dakota; 47°05′55″N 103°32′14″W	Dakota Prairie Grasslands	1,028,784 acres (4,163.3 km^{2})	The largest National Grassland, Little Missouri includes badlands and short and long grass prairie.
Lyndon B. Johnson		Texas; 33°20′56″N 97°39′32″W	National Forests and Grasslands in Texas	20,309 acres (82.2 km^{2})	Used primarily for recreation, Lyndon B. Johnson National Grassland has no fees and is located northwest of Fort Worth.
McClellan Creek		Texas; 35°12′42″N 100°52′16″W	Cibola National Forest	1,449 acres (5.9 km^{2})	McClellan Creek National Grassland surrounds Lake McClellan, and nearly all of the grassland was burned in 2006.
Oglala		Nebraska; 42°54′56″N 103°38′14″W	Nebraska National Forests	94,520 acres (382.5 km^{2})	The badlands of Toadstool Geologic Park are within Oglala National Grassland.
Pawnee		Colorado; 40°47′38″N 104°05′01″W	Arapaho and Roosevelt National Forests	193,060 acres (781.3 km^{2})	Pawnee has camping at Crow Valley Recreation Area and trails to the Pawnee Buttes.
Rita Blanca		Texas, Oklahoma; 36°26′04″N 102°36′01″W	Cibola National Forest	92,989 acres (376.3 km^{2})	Rita Blanca includes grasslands.
Sheyenne		North Dakota; 46°25′36″N 97°17′43″W	Dakota Prairie Grasslands	70,446 acres (285.1 km^{2})	Sheyenne provides habitat for the largest population of greater prairie chickens in North Dakota as well as the Dakota skipper butterfly and western prairie fringed orchid.
Thunder Basin		Wyoming; 43°41′09″N 105°00′56″W	Medicine Bow – Routt National Forest	547,499 acres (2,215.6 km^{2})	Thunder Basin is located in the Powder River Basin between the Big Horn Mountains and the Black Hills.

== Related ==
The smaller Midewin National Tallgrass Prairie, created much later and east of the Mississippi River, is technically not a "National Grassland", as it was formed under different legislation, but it is managed by the Forest Service like one, as a unique prairie resource.

Name	Photo	Location	Date formed	Area	Description
Midewin National Tallgrass Prairie		Illinois; 41°22′44″N 88°06′46″W	1996	20,283 acres (82.1 km^{2})	The only federally managed prairie east of the Mississippi River, Midewin is in the Central forest-grasslands transition ecoregion and was created when land was transferred to the U.S. Forest Service from the U.S. Army. In 2015, a small research herd of American Bison were reintroduced to study the effect of this large prairie animal on tallgrass prairie regeneration.

== See also ==
- Temperate grasslands, savannas, and shrublands
- List of protected grasslands of North America
- List of national forests of the United States
- National Wilderness Preservation System
