= Toadstool (disambiguation) =

Toadstool may refer to:

- Toadstool, the fruiting body of a fungus, also called toadstool
- Princess Peach, the damsel-in-distress and Mushroom Kingdom's ruler in Mario, formerly called Princess Toadstool
- Toadstool Geologic Park, an American park located in Nebraska
- Toadstool (short story), a 1966 James Bond short story by the Harvard Lampoon
- Toadstool, a mushroom-like plant from the game Plants vs. Zombies 2
