= Buffalo Gap National Grassland =

Protected area in southwestern South Dakota, United States

- Location within South Dakota Location within the United States
- Interactive map of Buffalo Gap National Grassland
- Location: South Dakota, United States
- Nearest city: Hot Springs, SD
- Coordinates: 43°29′57″N 102°53′21″W
- Area: 595,715 acres (2,410.77 km^{2})
- Established: June 23, 1960
- Governing body: U.S. Forest Service
- Website: Buffalo Gap National Grassland

Buffalo Gap National Grassland is a National Grassland located primarily in southwestern South Dakota, United States. It is also the second largest National Grassland, after Little Missouri National Grassland in North Dakota. Characteristics of the grasslands include mixed prairie and chalky badlands. The grassland is managed by the U.S. Forest Service and is a division of Nebraska National Forest. In descending order of land area it is located in parts of Fall River, Pennington, Jackson, and Custer counties.

Buffalo Gap National Grassland is managed by the Forest Service together with the Nebraska and Samuel R. McKelvie National Forests and the Fort Pierre and Oglala National Grasslands from common offices in Chadron, Nebraska. There are local ranger district offices located in Hot Springs and Wall. It also surrounds Badlands National Park and Minuteman Missile National Historic Site.

In what is known as the Conata Basin region of the grassland, the most successful Black-footed ferret reintroduction program undertaken by the federal government, has established a small but sustainable population of these previously extirpated mammals.

In 2010, South Dakota senator Tim Johnson introduced the Tony Dean Cheyenne River Valley Conservation Act of 2010, a bill that would designate over 48,000 acres (19,000 ha) of the National Grassland as protected wilderness. The act would allow the continuation of grazing and hunting on the land and would create the first national grassland wilderness in the country.

In Jan. 2013, Charmaine White Face raised concerns about radiation exposure of South Dakota Army National Guard soldiers in the Buffalo Gap National Grassland.

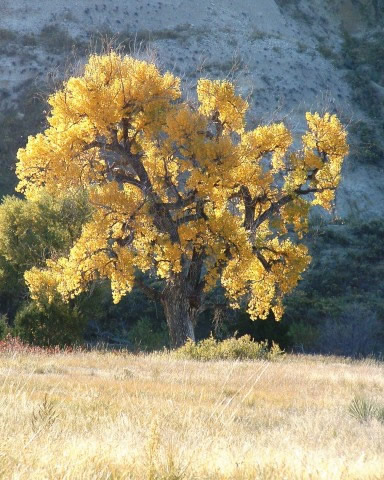

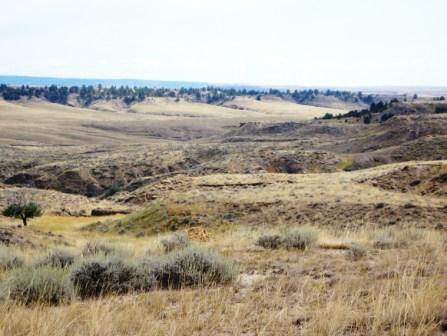

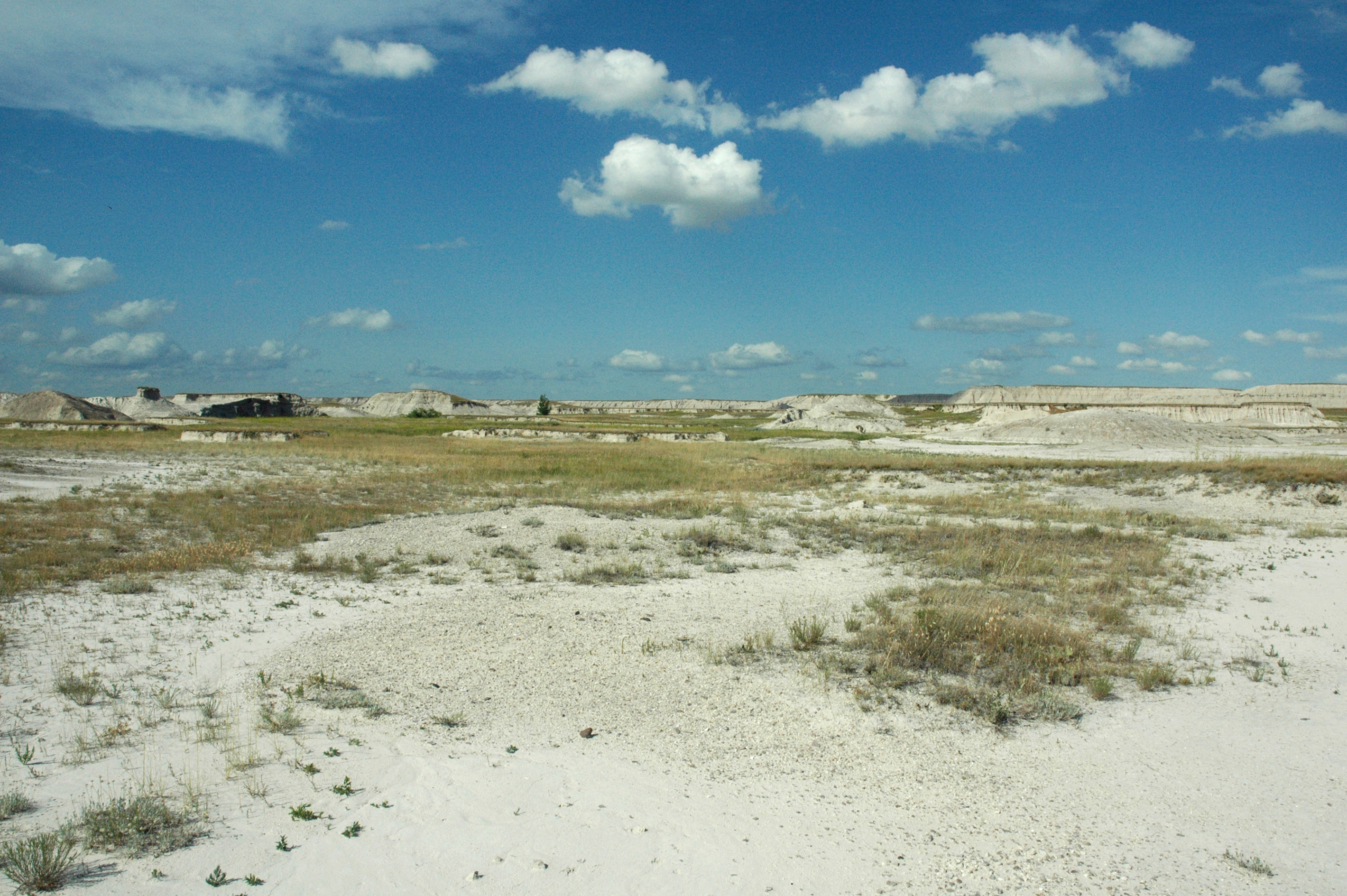

== National Grasslands Visitor Center ==
The National Grasslands Visitor Center in Wall, South Dakota is part of the Buffalo Gap National Grassland – Wall Ranger District. The center features exhibits about grassland wildlife and plants, grazing management and the history of the Great Plains. There is also a theater with a video about the grasslands, restrooms and a gift shop.
