= LuAnn Wandsnider =

American professor

Dr. LuAnn Wandsnider is an American professor who has served as Chair of the Anthropology Department at the University of Nebraska-Lincoln since 2012.

== Biography ==
Wandsnider received her Ph.D. in anthropology from the University of New Mexico in 1989.

== Research activities ==
Wandsnider has conducted archaeological research in locations across the globe, but has recently done work in Nebraska including the Salt Creek Basin in Eastern Nebraska and the Oglala National Grassland in northwestern Nebraska.

Her primary research interests are in Resiliency Thinking, Mediterranean Archaeology, Time in Archaeology, Archaeological Method and Theory, High and Central Plains Archaeology and signaling Theory.

== Awards ==
2014 – Asa T. Hill Memorial Award for Contributions to the Archaeology of the Great Plains (with Christopher Dore and John Swigert, for development of the first state-based cultural resource GIS), Nebraska State Historical Society, Lincoln, NE, 15 October 2014

== Publications ==
- 2013 Wandsnider, LuAnn Public Benefactions in Western Rough Cilicia: Insights from Signaling Theory. In Current Research in Western Rough Cilicia, edited by M. Hoff and R. Townsend, pp. 170–181. Oxbow Press, Oxford.
- 2014 Wandsnider, LuAnn Lewis Roberts Binford. Encyclopedia of Global Archaeology (on-line and print). Springer, New York.
- 2015 Wandsnider, LuAnn and Lauren Nelson Monumental Civic Architecture Signals Group Identity, Affiliation, and Effective Collective Action: Prospects for Investigation in the Greek Cities of Late Hellenistic and Early Roman Asia Minor as Explored for Roman Aphrodisias. In Landscape and Identity, edited by Kurt Springs, pp. 55–69. Oxford, BAR International Series 2709.
