= Hudson-Meng Bison Kill =

Coordinates: 42.828618°N 103.601527°W

- Hudson-Meng Bison Bonebed
- U.S. National Register of Historic Places
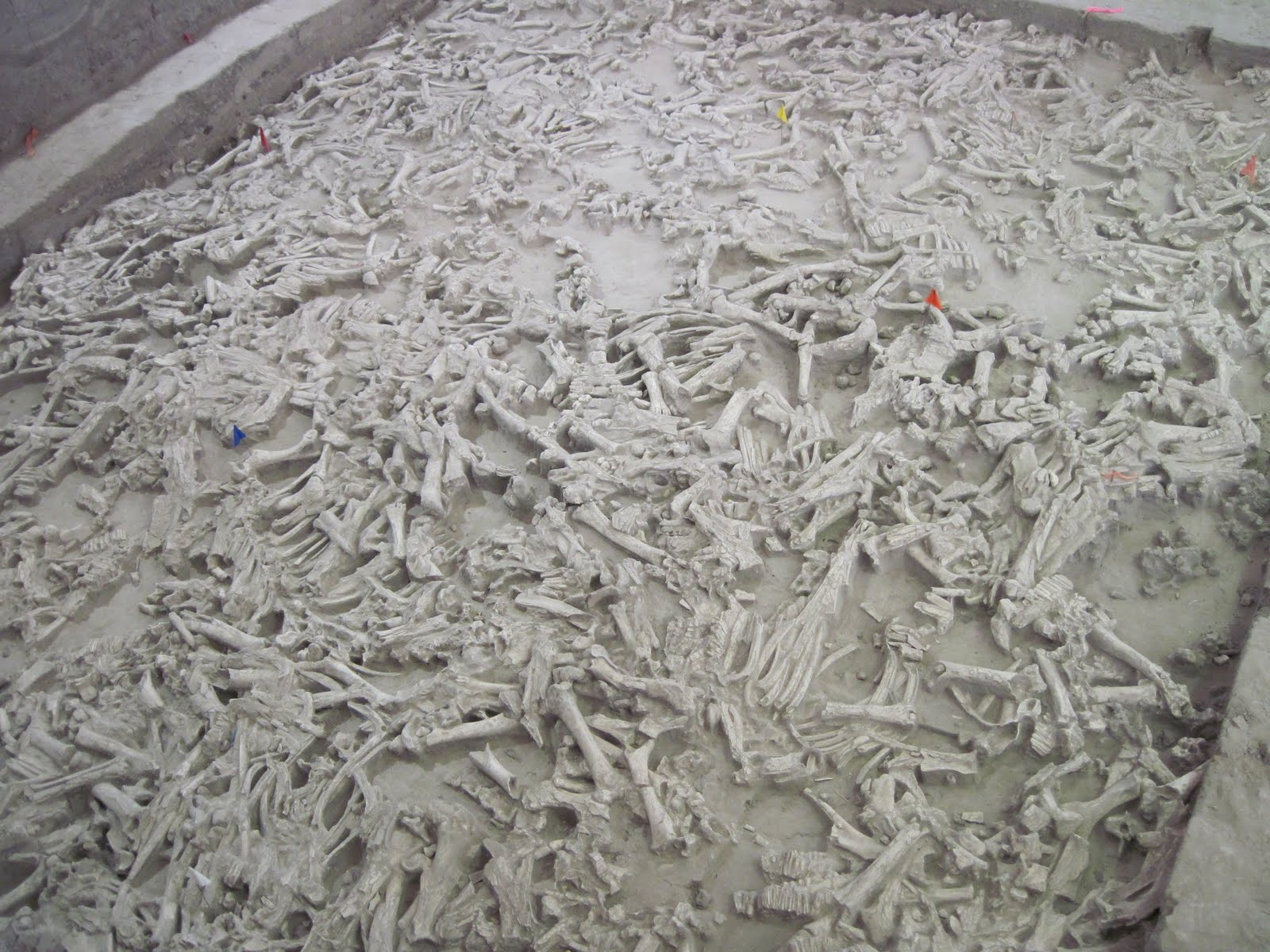
- The dig site at Hudson-Meng

- Location within Nebraska Location within the United States
- Nearest city: Crawford, Nebraska
- Area: 20 acres (8.1 ha)
- Website: Hudson-Meng Education & Research Center
- NRHP reference No.: 73001076
- Added to NRHP: August 28, 1973

The Hudson-Meng Bison Bonebed site, officially named the Hudson-Meng Education and Research Center, is a fossil site located in the Oglala National Grassland of Sioux County, Nebraska 20 miles (32 km) northwest of Crawford. It contains the 10,000-year-old remains of up to 600 bison.

Open seasonally, the site features a visitor center with interpretive exhibits and views of the bones. Guided tours are available.

The Bison Trail to Toadstool Geologic Park is a 3 miles (4.8 km) hike.

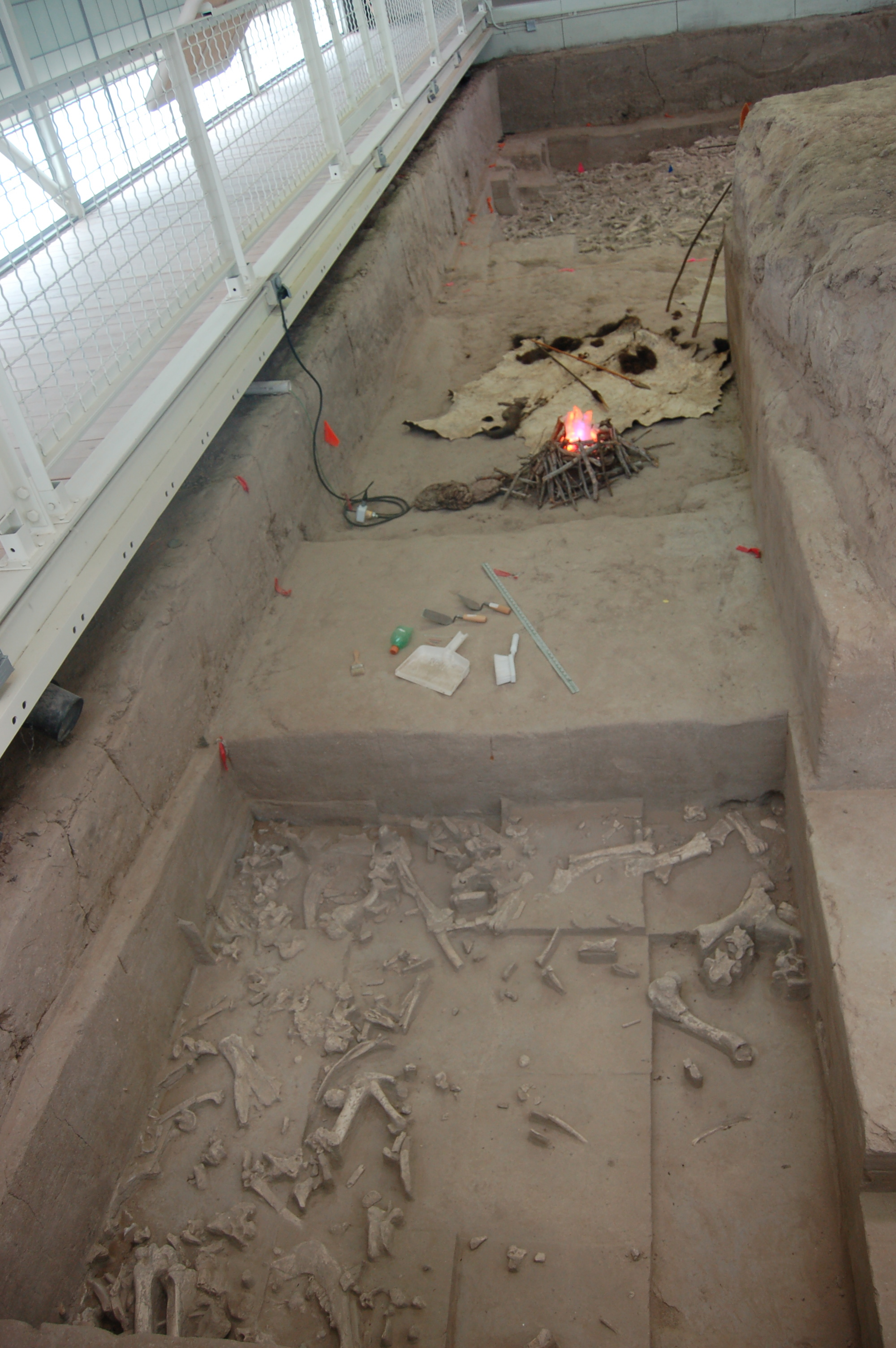
Part of the site is protected by a building

== History ==
Bill Hudson and Albert Meng were local ranchers who are credited with discovering the bonebed in 1954 while digging for a pond. Originally excavated by Dr. Larry Agenbroad in the 1970s, the dig was over 400 square meters and was considered the largest Alberta Culture bison kill site ever discovered. The bison found are not the same species as the bison that currently live in the United States (Bison bison), but are an animal transitional in evolution between the extinct Bison antiquus and the modern species.

In the 1990s, the site underwent another series of excavations by Drs. Larry Todd of Colorado State University and David Rapson of the University of Wyoming, who determined that the bison died of unknown natural causes and that the site was not in fact a kill site.

In 2005, PaleoCultural Research Group and the University of Colorado undertook excavations at the site. In 2006, the USFS made Dr. Mark Muñiz of St. Cloud State University the principal investigator for archeological research. The research since 2006 has uncovered an Eden component at the site in addition to the Alberta component.

The site was managed for two years by The Mammoth Site of Hot Springs, South Dakota under the supervision of the United States Forest Service. As of 2009, the site is managed by the US Forest Service out of Chadron, Nebraska.
