= Fort Pierre National Grassland =

Protected area in central South Dakota

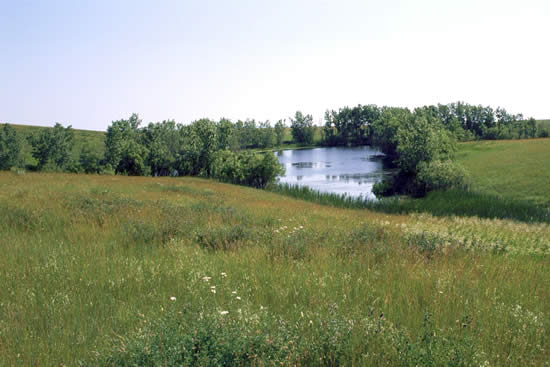

- Location within South Dakota Location within the United States
- Interactive map of Fort Pierre National Grassland
- Location: Lyman, Stanley and Jones counties, South Dakota, United States
- Coordinates: 44.141°N 100.279°W
- Area: 115,890 acres (469.0 km^{2})
- Governing body: U.S. Forest Service
- Website: Fort Pierre National Grassland

Fort Pierre National Grassland is a United States National Grassland in central South Dakota, south of the capital city Pierre and its neighbor Fort Pierre. The national grassland is primarily a mixed-grass prairie and has a land area of 115,890 acres (46,900 ha). In descending order of area it lies in parts of Lyman, Stanley, and Jones counties. Part of the movie Dances with Wolves was filmed there. It is managed by the U.S. Forest Service together with the Nebraska and Samuel R. McKelvie National Forests and the Buffalo Gap and Oglala National Grasslands from common offices in Chadron, Nebraska. There is a local ranger district office located in Pierre.
