= Grand River National Grassland =

Protected area in northwestern South Dakota, United States

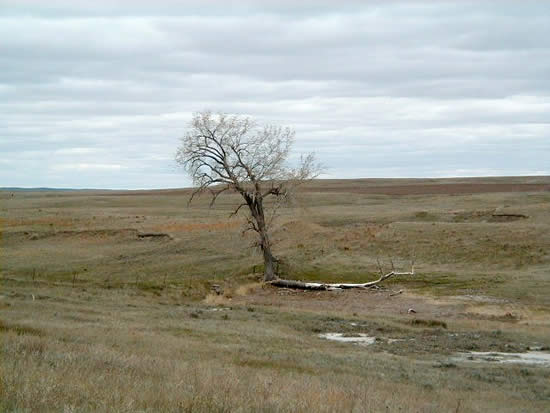

- Location within South Dakota Location within the United States
- Interactive map of Grand River National Grassland
- Location: Perkins, Corson and Ziebach counties, South Dakota, United States
- Coordinates: 45.736°N 102.361°W
- Area: 154,783 acres (626.38 km^{2})
- Established: 1960
- Governing body: U.S. Forest Service
- Website: Grand River National Grassland

Grand River National Grassland is a National Grassland in northwestern South Dakota, United States. It is named for the Grand River. The North and South forks of the rivers meet in the grassland. It has a land area of 154,783 acres (62,638 ha). In descending order of acreage it lies in parts of Perkins, Corson, and Ziebach counties. The portion in Corson County also lies within the Standing Rock Sioux Reservation. The portion in Ziebach County also lies within the Cheyenne River Indian Reservation.

In the early 1900s, the area was settled by European immigrants under the Homestead Act. In the 1930s a severe drought along with high winds turned the area into a “Dust Bowl.” During the Great Depression, many of the settlers experienced great financial hardships. Under the Agricultural Adjustment Act, the government purchased failed homesteads in order to minimize the economic hardships. These purchased lands were consolidated and rehabilitated and the administration was transferred to the Forest Service and formally designated the Grand River National Grassland in 1960.

The grassland is administered by the USDA-Forest Service as part of the Dakota Prairie Grasslands (DPG) from offices in Bismarck, North Dakota. There is a local Ranger District office (shared with Cedar River National Grassland) in Lemmon, South Dakota. The DPG is part of Region One of the Forest Service. The Regional Headquarters is in Missoula, MT.

== Description ==
The District has a variety of habitats: mixed grass prairie, river bottom, green ash draws, sand dunes along the South Fork of the Grand River, badlands, sandstone outcrops and buttes, and claypan areas with a few small playas in Corson County. Approximately 20,000 acres (8,100 ha) of the District is old cropland that was reseeded to crested wheatgrass. There have been 476 species from 78 families have been discovered so far. For birding enthusiasts, there is also a comprehensive birding checklist of the District.

The District has a 7-mile (11 km) hiking, horseback riding and mountain biking trail south of Lemmon about 12 miles (19 km) called the Blacktail Trail. It is a loop trail. The trail head is located adjacent to State Highway 73. The trail takes you through mixed grass prairie and badlands and passes near one of only two aspen stands on the District. A picnic area and fishing area is also located at the trailhead. A good gravel road connects the trailhead to the highway.

The District also shares part of the shoreline of Shadehill Reservoir. This area is accessible from South Dakota Highway 73, west of the highway. This part of the lakeshore is adjacent to the South Cabin sites. Camping is free. A good gravel shoreline is available for fishing. As you travel on most of the grasslands, it is all open to livestock grazing, so you will have to share it with cattle. This includes the roadways.

Recent projects on the District include planting cottonwoods along the South Fork of the Grand River and revamping crested wheatgrass stands with native seedings.
