= Charmaine White Face =

Native American activist

- Zumila Wobaga
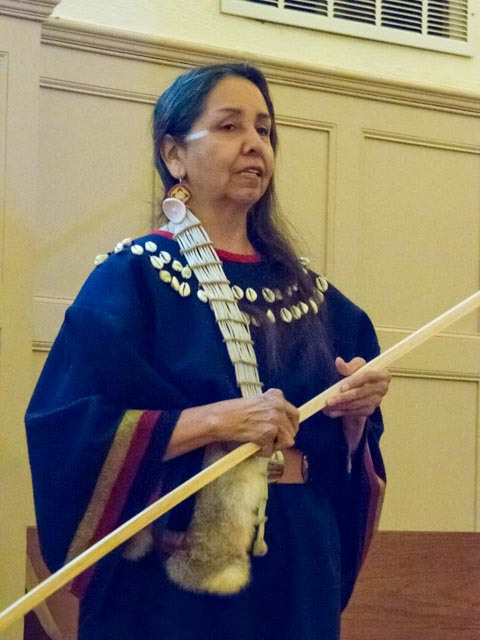
- Charmaine White Face presenting "America's Chernobyl" – the facts about the 3,272 abandoned open pit uranium mines in the Great Sioux Territory – on a 10-day tour on the East Coast, 2013

Oglala Tituwan elder

Personal details
- Born: Deadwood, SD
- Awards: 2007 Nuclear Free Future Award, Salzburg, Austria; In April 2017, she received the 2017 Dakota Conference Award for Distinguished Contribution to the Preservation of the Cultural Heritage of the Northern Plains from the Center for Western Studies, Augustana University, Sioux Falls, SD.

Charmaine White Face, or Zumila Wobaga, is an Oglala Tetuwan (Lakota language speaker) from the Oglala Sioux Tribe, part of the Oceti Sakowin (Great Sioux Nation) in North America.

She is known for her work in support of Native American rights, in particular as coordinator of the Defenders of the Black Hills, a volunteer environmental organization centered on efforts to encourage the United States government to honor the Fort Laramie Treaties of 1851 and 1868.

She also works at the international level in support of recognition of human rights of Indigenous peoples all over the world. She was a participant in the prayer fast/hunger strike held in December 2004 in Geneva, Switzerland at the final meeting of the Intersessional Working Group on the Draft Declaration on the Rights of Indigenous Peoples (WGDD). She has worked to preserve Bear Butte, on monitoring of abandoned uranium mines, on "environmental remediation of hazardous waste ponds," and in the anti-nuclear power movement. In Jan. 2013, she raised concerns about radiation exposure of South Dakota Army National Guard soldiers in the Buffalo Gap National Grassland.

Charmaine White Face is also a columnist and freelance writer who has written for Indian Country Today, the Rapid City Journal, the Sioux Falls Argus Leader, and The Lakota Journal, and is a grandmother.

== See also ==
- Black Hills
- Janet McCloud
- Uranium in the environment
- Anti-nuclear movement in the United States
- The Navajo People and Uranium Mining
- Uranium mining debate
- Thomas Banyacya
