= Sheyenne National Grassland =

National Grassland in southeastern North Dakota, United States

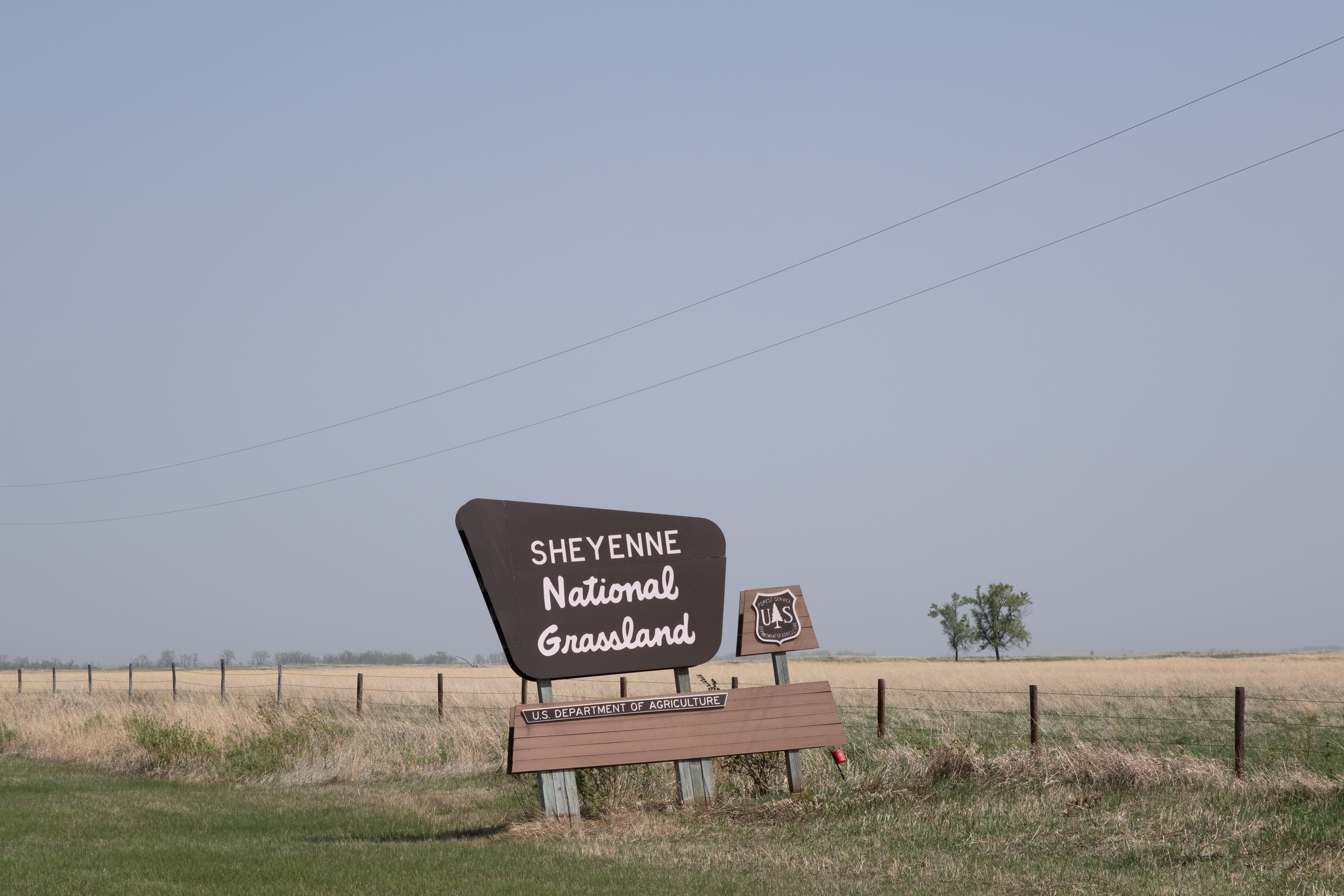

- Location within North Dakota Location within the United States
- Interactive map of Sheyenne National Grassland
- Location: Ransom and Richland counties, North Dakota, United States
- Nearest city: Milnor, ND
- Coordinates: 46°25′37″N 97°17′42″W
- Area: 70,446 acres (285.08 km^{2})
- Governing body: U.S. Forest Service
- Website: Sheyenne National Grassland

Sheyenne National Grassland is a National Grassland located in southeastern North Dakota in the United States, comprising 70,446 acres (28,508 ha) of public land amid 64,769 acres (26,211 ha) of privately owned land in a region of sandy soils in the vicinity of the Sheyenne River in Ransom and Richland Counties. It is the only National Grassland in the tallgrass prairie region of the U.S. The grassland provides habitat for the largest population of greater prairie chickens in North Dakota, as well as the Dakota skipper butterfly, the western prairie fringed orchid, and numerous ferns, as well as grazing land for approximately 83 cattle ranchers.

A 31-mile (50 km) segment of the North Country National Scenic Trail crosses the Grassland from east to west and is open to hiking, horseback riding, and mountain biking. Find a map and trail information at https://northcountrytrail.org/dpc/.

The grassland lies in eastern Ransom and western Richland counties, about 12 miles (19 km) east of the city of Lisbon. The grassland is administered by the Forest Service as part of the Dakota Prairie Grasslands from offices in Bismarck, North Dakota. There are local ranger district offices in Lisbon.
