= Cedar River National Grassland =

Protected area in southern North Dakota

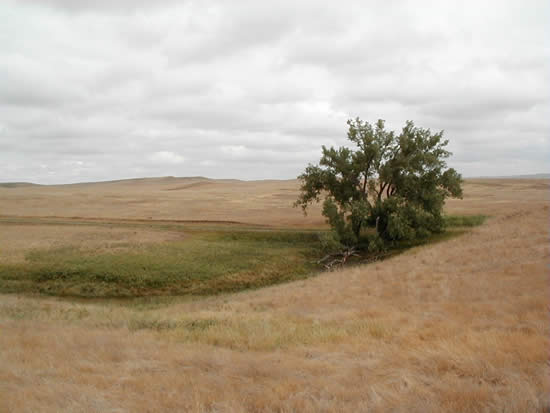

- Location within North Dakota Location within the United States
- Interactive map of Cedar River National Grassland
- Location: Sioux and Grant counties, North Dakota, United States
- Nearest city: Lemmon, SD
- Coordinates: 45.9552°N 101.8443°W
- Area: 6,717 acres (27.18 km^{2})
- Governing body: U.S. Forest Service
- Website: Cedar River National Grassland

Cedar River National Grassland is a National Grassland located in Sioux County and Grant County in southern North Dakota, United States. It has a land area of 6,717 acres (2,718 ha). The portion in Sioux County lies within the Standing Rock Sioux Reservation. Within the grassland are topographic features such as level plains and rolling hills. Dry streams and some small flowing streams exist throughout the Grasslands.

The grassland is administered by the U.S. Forest Service as part of the Dakota Prairie Grasslands from offices in Bismarck, North Dakota. There are local ranger district offices (shared with Grand River National Grassland) in Lemmon, South Dakota.
