= Dakota Prairie Grasslands =

Coordinates: 46°N 100°W

- IUCN category Ib (wilderness area)
- Location: North Dakota, South Dakota, United States
- Area: 1,265,217 acres (512,015 ha)
- Established: 1998
- Governing body: U.S. Forest Service
- Website: Dakota Prairie Grasslands

The Dakota Prairie Grasslands (DPG) are a collection of grasslands in North Dakota and South Dakota, United States. It was formed in 1998 and consists of four U.S. Forest Service Ranger District offices that manage four National Grasslands:

- North Dakota
  - Cedar River National Grassland
  - Little Missouri National Grassland
  - Sheyenne National Grassland
- South Dakota
  - Grand River National Grassland

== History ==
All of these ranger districts were formerly part of the Custer National Forest based in Billings, Montana. The Chief of the Forest Service created the DPG as a separate unit to help focus and better manage the issues and resources of the National Grasslands.

The four National Grasslands now have a total area of 1,265,217 acres (512,015 ha).

== Administration ==
The Supervisor's office is located in Bismarck, North Dakota. The Little Missouri National Grassland is administered from offices in Dickinson and Watford City. The Sheyenne National Grassland is administered from the office in Lisbon. The Grand River and Cedar River National Grasslands are administered from the office located in Lemmon, South Dakota.

== See also ==
- Shortgrass prairie
- Tallgrass prairie
