= Oglala National Grassland =

Protected area in northwest Nebraska

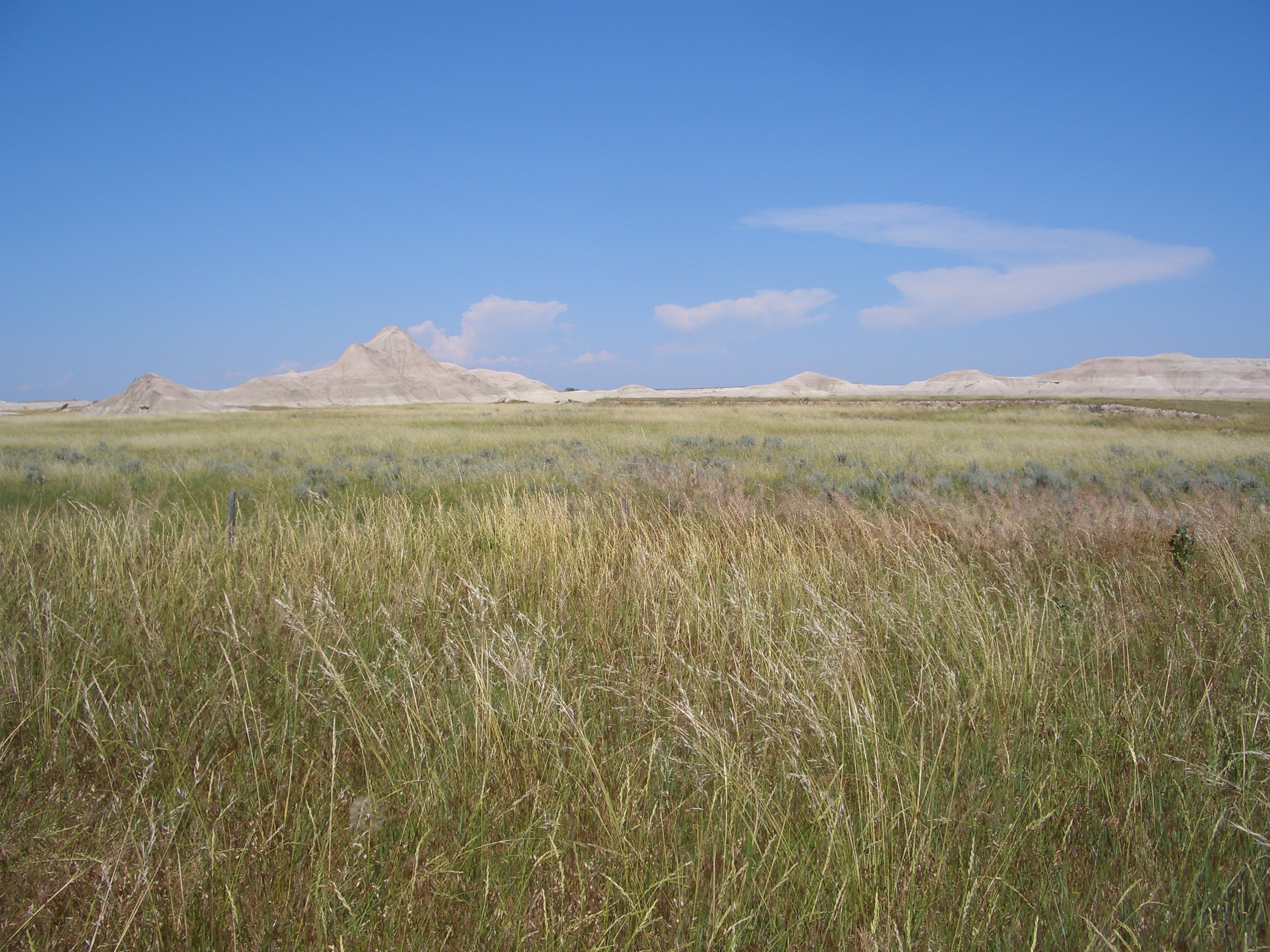
- Oglala National Grassland

- Location within Nebraska Location within the United States
- Interactive map of Oglala National Grassland
- Location: Sioux County and Dawes County, Nebraska, USA
- Nearest city: Crawford, NE
- Coordinates: 42°54′54″N 103°38′13″W
- Area: 94,520 acres (382.5 km^{2})
- Governing body: U.S. Forest Service
- Website: Oglala National Grassland

The Oglala National Grassland is a United States National Grassland in the northwest corner of Nebraska. It is in northern Sioux and northwestern Dawes counties, on the borders with South Dakota and Wyoming. It is 94,520 acres (38,250 ha) in size and is one of the small handful of National Grasslands administered by the US Department of Agriculture's Forest Service. It is managed by the U.S. Forest Service together with the Nebraska and Samuel R. McKelvie National Forests and the Buffalo Gap and Fort Pierre National Grasslands from common offices in Chadron, Nebraska.

== Setting ==
The Oglala National Grassland features a landscape of shortgrass prairie and dramatic badlands formations. It is Nebraska's only region of the Pierre Shale.

Deciduous trees common to the Oglala National Grassland include the eastern cottonwood, the green ash, and the peach leaf willow. It includes the native range of the American bison. Over one hundred birds and fifty mammals have been observed in the Oglala National Grassland. The historian Francis Moul (1940-2023) wrote:

Sensitive species include the finged myotis bat, black-tailed prairie dog, swift fox, gerruginous hawk with one to three active nests per year, norther harrier, long-billed curlew with several colonies in pastures, burrowing owl, migrating American peregrine falcon, short-eared owl, loggerhead shrike, McCown's and chestnut-collared longspur, and northern leopard frog. More common species include mule and whitetailed deer, pronghorn, coyote, wild turkey, elk and big horn sheep on Round Top, and sharp-tailed grouse with scattered leks, or dancing grounds.

During the 1930s, the Civilian Conservation Corps built around one hundred ponds and a few reservoirs for livestock on the Oglala National Grassland.

== Climate and geology ==
Oglala National Grassland has a semi-arid climate with temperatures that vary. Precipitation is of a light nature.

The region experienced volcanic ash deposits in the Eocene and Piacenzian periods.

== Attractions ==
Oglala National Grassland is home to some of the most striking badlands formations in Toadstool Geologic Park, near Crawford, Nebraska and Whitney, Nebraska.

The Hudson-Meng Bison Kill, also located on the grassland, is an archaeological excavation in progress.

The Warbonnet Battlefield Monument, commemorating the 1876 Battle of Warbonnet Creek, is located in Oglala National Grassland on Montrose Road.

The grassland also contains the Agate, Bordgate, and Rock Bass reservoirs.
