= Toadstool Geologic Park =

Natural area in Nebraska, US

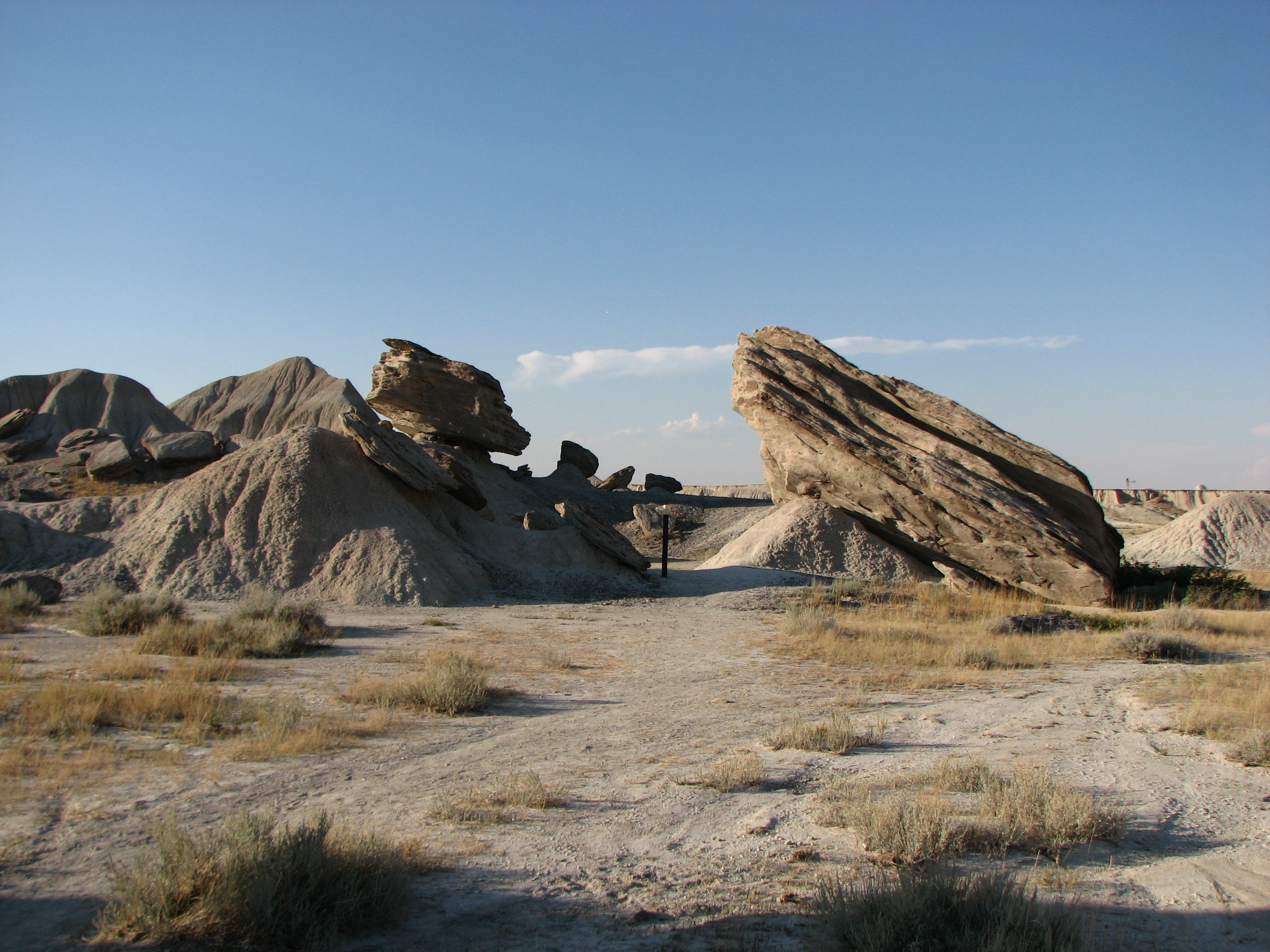
- Toadstool Park in 2006

- Location within the United States
- Location: Dawes County, Nebraska, United States
- Nearest city: Crawford, NE
- Coordinates: 42.857777°N 103.583937°W
- Governing body: U.S. Forest Service
- Website: Toadstool Geologic Park

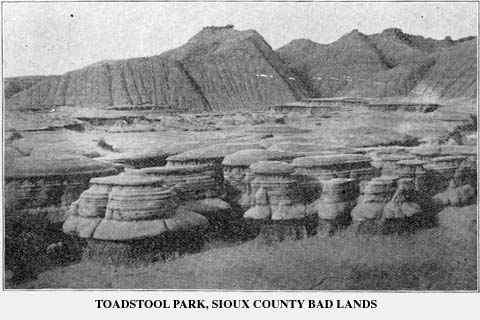
Toadstool Park in 1905

Toadstool Geologic Park is located in the Oglala National Grassland in far northwestern Nebraska. It is operated by the United States Forest Service. It contains a badlands landscape and a reconstructed sod house. The park is named after its unusual rock formations, many of which resemble toadstools.

== About ==
Toadstool Geologic Park is said to be the "badlands of Nebraska" or the "desert of the Pine Ridge." The park is open 24 hours a day. Toadstool Park is north of Crawford, Nebraska; to get to the park, take Nebraska Highway 2/Nebraska Highway 71 to Toadstool Road. There is a 1-mile loop trail within the park. There are many fossils along the trail; removing fossils is not allowed. Many fossils of large prehistoric animals such as entelodonts and hyaenodons have been found here. Camping is available and there are two toilets.

The Bison Trail to Hudson-Meng Bison Kill is a 3-mile hike. The route crosses Whitehead Creek, which forms a ravine splitting the plain between the geologic park and the kill bed interpretive center.

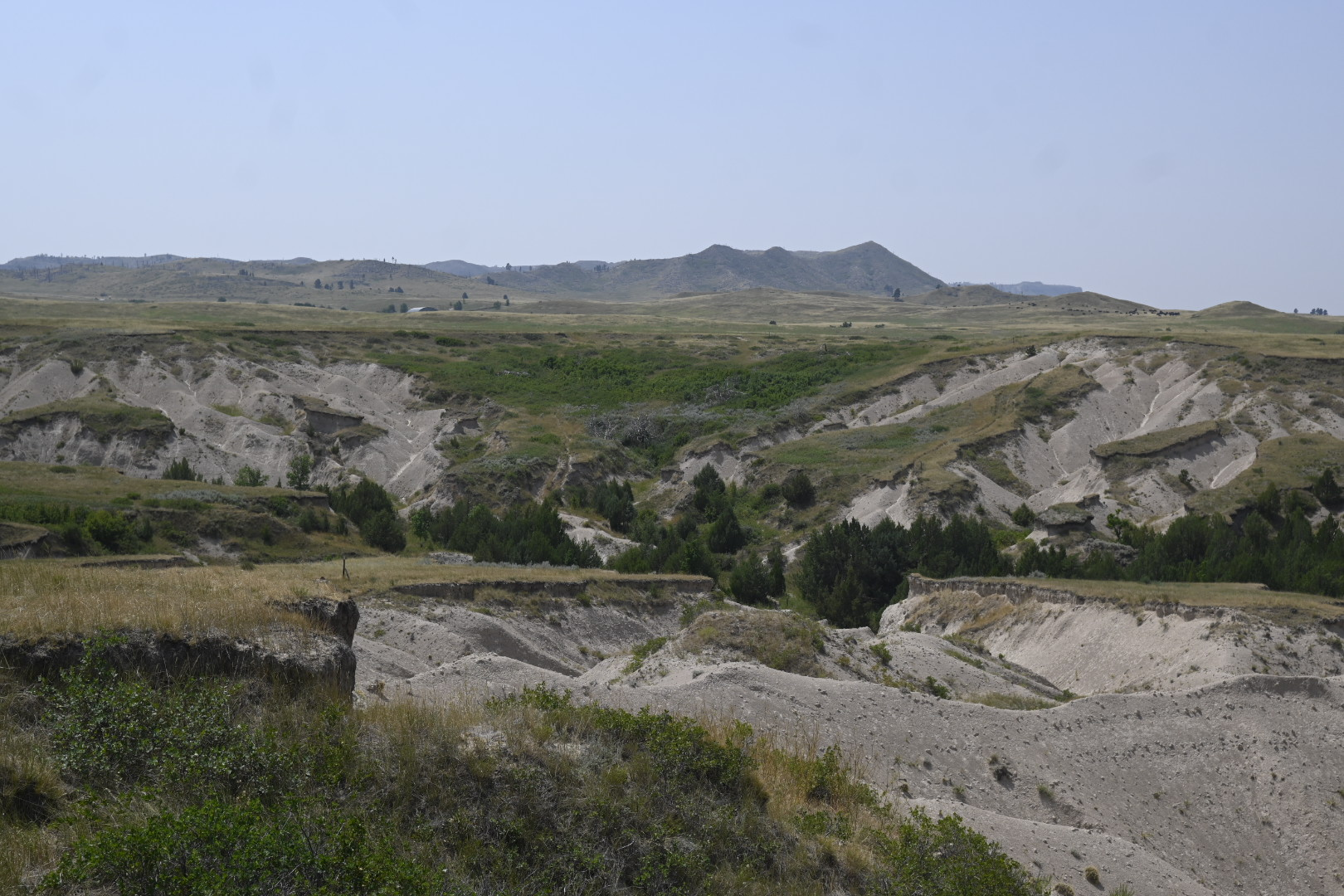
View of the Whitehead Creek in Oglala National Grassland from the Bison Hiking Trail

== Nearby attractions ==
- Fort Robinson
- Hudson-Meng Bison Kill
- Nebraska National Forest
- Chadron State Park
- Trailside Museum of Natural History at Fort Robinson State Park
