= Badlands =

Type of heavily eroded terrain

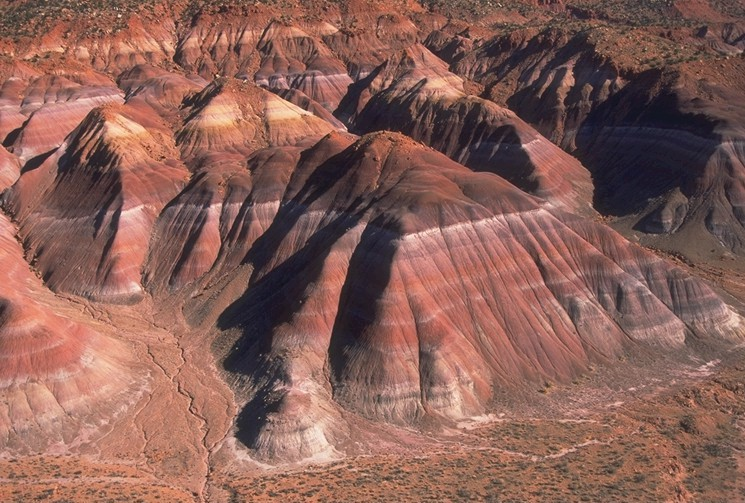
The Chinle Badlands at Grand Staircase–Escalante National Monument, Utah, United States

Badlands are a type of dry terrain where softer sedimentary rocks and clay-rich soils have been extensively eroded. They are characterized by steep slopes, minimal vegetation, lack of a substantial regolith, and high drainage density. Ravines, gullies, buttes, hoodoos and other such geologic forms are common in badlands.

Badlands are found on every continent except Antarctica, being most common where there are unconsolidated sediments. They are often difficult to navigate by foot, and are unsuitable for agriculture. Most are a result of natural processes, but destruction of vegetation by overgrazing or pollution can produce anthropogenic badlands.

== Badlands topography ==
Badlands are characterized by a distinctive badlands topography. This is terrain in which water erosion has cut a very large number of deep drainage channels, separated by short, steep ridges (interfluves). Such a drainage system is said to have a very fine drainage texture, as measured by its drainage density. Drainage density is defined as the total length of drainage channels per unit area of land surface. Badlands have a very high drainage density of 48 to 464 kilometres per square kilometre (77 to 747 miles per square mile). The numerous deep drainage channels and high interfluves creates a stark landscape of hills, gullies, and ravines.

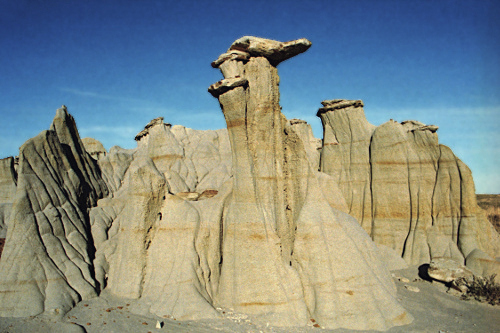
Caprock atop hoodoos in Theodore Roosevelt National Park, North Dakota, U.S.

In addition to a dense system of drainages and interfluves, badlands often contain buttes and hoodoos. These are formed by resistant beds of sandstone, which form the caprock of the buttes and hoodoos.

== Origin ==
Badlands arise from a combination of an impermeable but easily eroded ground surface, sparse vegetation, and infrequent but heavy rainfall. The surface bedrock is typically mudrock, sometimes with evaporites, with only occasional beds of more resistant sandstone. Infrequent heavy rains lead to heavy erosional dissection. Where sudden precipitation cannot penetrate impermeable clays, it is channeled into a very dense system of streamlets that erode a dense system of ever-enlarging, coalescing gulleys and ravines. Erosion is enhanced by pelting raindrops that dislodge soft sediments. The presence of bentonite clay further increases erodibility, as can rejuvenation of the drainage system from regional uplift, as occurred at Badlands National Park.

In addition to surface erosion, badlands sometimes have well-developed piping, which is a system of pipes, joints, caverns, and other connected void spaces in the subsurface through which water can drain. However, this is not a universal feature of badlands. For example, the Henry Mountains badlands show very little piping.

The precise processes by which the erosion responses take place vary depending on the precise interbedding of the sedimentary material. However, it has been estimated that the badlands of Badlands National Park erode at the relatively high rate of about one inch or 25 millimetres per year. The White River draining Badlands National Park was so named for its heavy load of bentonite clay eroded from the badlands.

=== Regolith ===
Badlands are partially characterized by their thin to nonexistent regolith layers. The regolith profiles of badlands in arid climates are likely to resemble one another. In these regions, the upper layer (~1–5 cm or 0.4–2.0 in) is typically composed of silt, shale, and sand (a byproduct of the weathered shale). This layer can form either a compact crust or a looser, more irregular aggregation of "popcorn" fragments. Located beneath the top layer is a sublayer (~5–10 cm or 2.0–3.9 in), below which can be found a transitional shard layer (~10–40 cm or 3.9–15.7 in), formed largely of loose disaggregated shale chips, which in turn eventually gives way to a layer of unweathered shale. Badlands such as those found in the Mancos Shale, the Brule Formation, the Chadron Formation, and the Dinosaur Provincial Park can be generally said to fit this profile.

In less arid regions, the regolith profile can vary considerably. Some badlands have no regolith layer whatsoever, capping instead in bare rock such as sandstone. Others have a regolith with a clay veneer, and still others have a biological crust of algae or lichens.

In addition to lacking significant regolith, they also lack much vegetation. The lack of vegetation could very well be a result of the lack of a substantial regolith.

=== Anthropogenic badlands ===
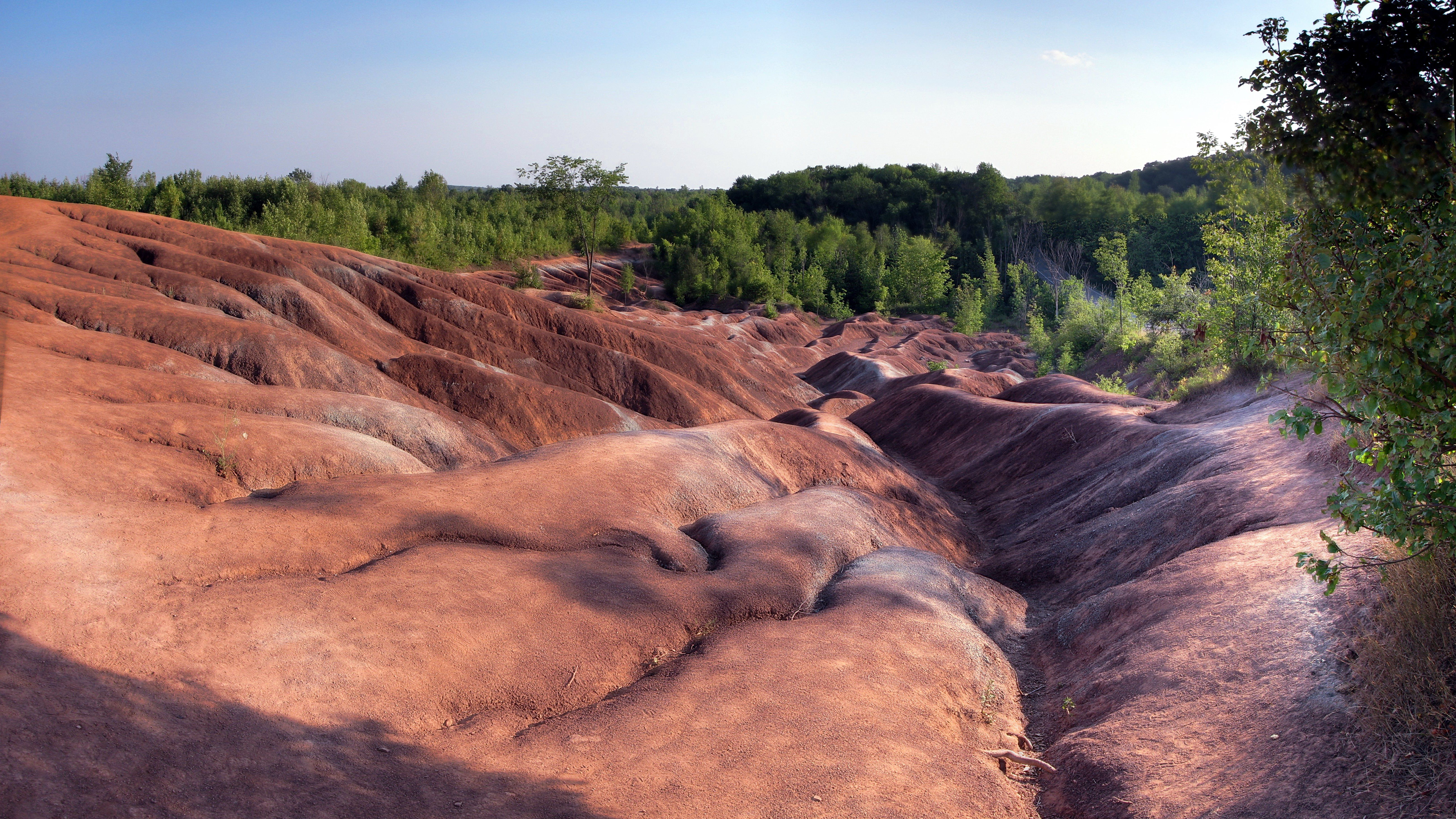
Cheltenham Badlands, Caledon, Canada

Although most badland topography is natural, badlands have been produced artificially by destruction of vegetation cover, through overgrazing, acid rain, or acid mine drainage. The Cheltenham Badlands in Caledon, Ontario, are an example of badlands produced by poor farming practices. In the early 1900s, the area was used for agricultural purposes, predominantly cattle grazing. Agricultural use ceased by 1931 and natural recovery of the majority of the property began. Once established, however, this type of erosion can continue rapidly, if land clearing, overgrazing, and increased foot traffic by humans persists, as the shale is highly susceptible to erosion.

An example of badlands created by mining is the Roman gold mine of Las Médulas in northern Spain.

== Etymology ==
The word badlands is a calque from the Canadian French phrase les mauvaises terres, as the early French fur traders called the White River badlands les mauvaises terres à traverser or 'bad lands to traverse', perhaps influenced by the Lakota people who moved there in the late 1700s and who referred to the terrain as mako sica, meaning 'bad land' or 'eroded land'.

The term malpaís means 'badlands' in Spanish, but refers to a terrain of lava flows that is unlike the eroded badlands of the White River.

== Human impact ==
Badlands are generally unsuitable for agriculture, but attempts have been made to remediate badlands. For example, reforestation is being attempted in the Garbeta badlands of Eastern India. Revegetation and reforestation have been studied in the black marl badlands of the French Alps. Austrian black pine can become established and then be gradually replaced by native deciduous species. However, the time scale for this process is many decades.

== Locations ==
Badlands are found on all the continents except Antarctica. The presence of unconsolidated sediments is a strong control on their locations.

=== Africa ===
The Sneeuburg Uplands in Karoo, South Africa are observed as having characteristics of badland geology.

=== Eurasia ===
==== China ====
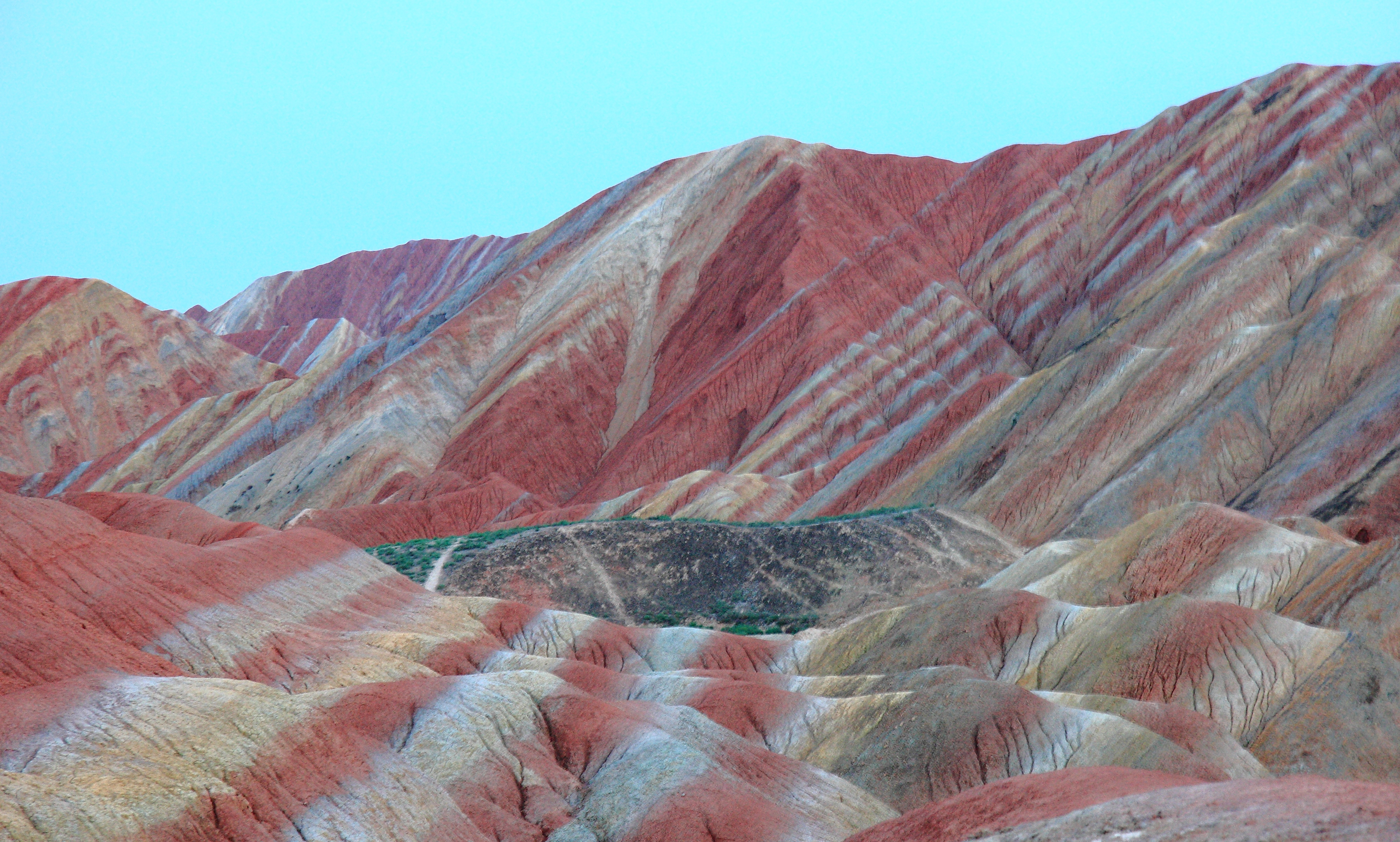
Zhangye National Geopark, Gansu, China

Zhangye National Geopark is a badlands area known for its colorful rock formations. It was voted by Chinese media outlets as one of the most beautiful landforms in China and became a UNESCO Global Geopark in 2019.

==== India ====
Garbeta, Eastern India, is a badlands located in a monsoon climate. Chambal spread across northern parts of Madhya Pradesh, southeastern Rajasthan and southern parts of Uttar Pradesh known for its lawlessness and dacoity is another example of badlands. A small strip of badlands is also found in western Uttar Pradesh and Haryana.

==== Italy ====
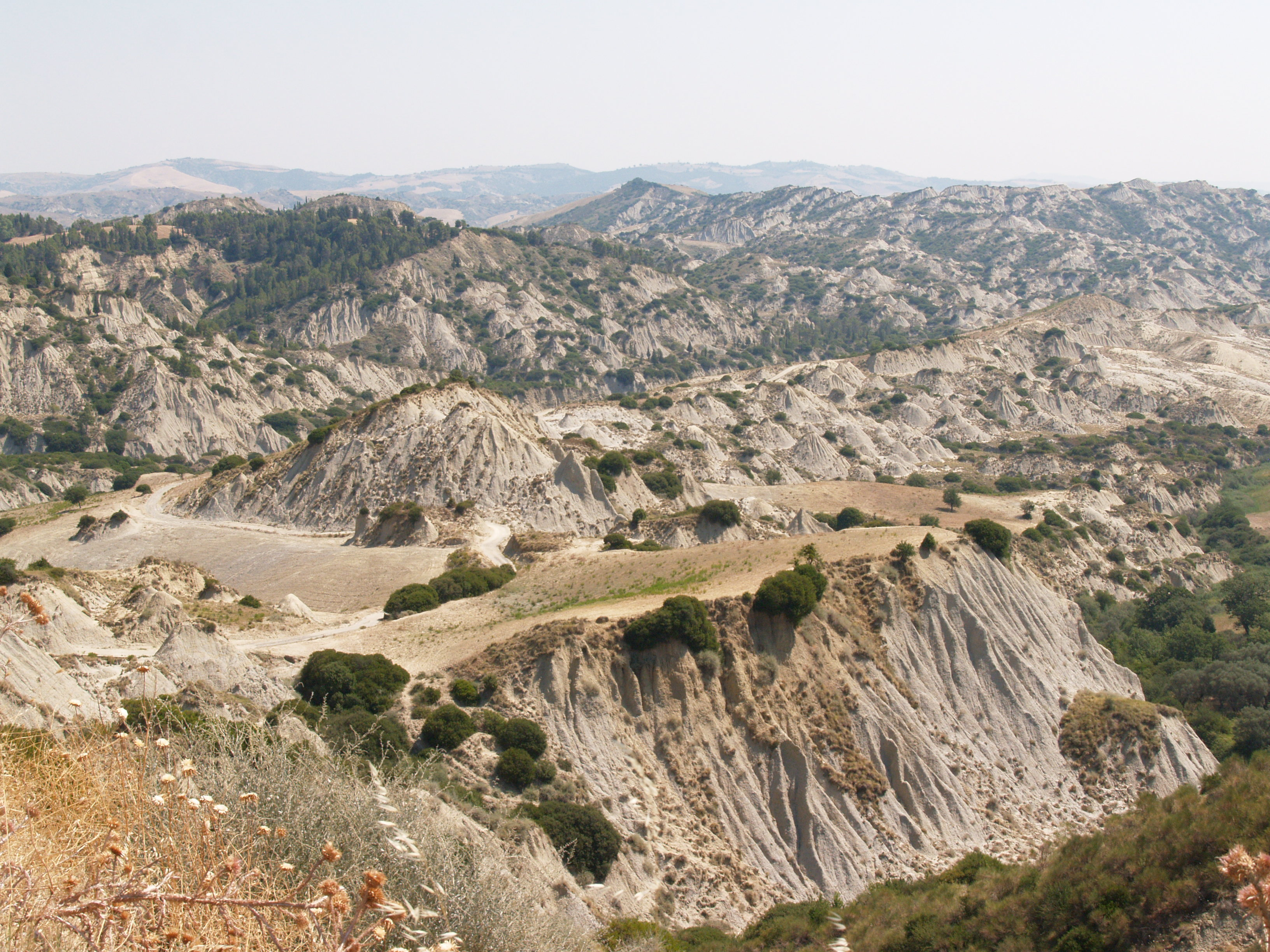
The "Calanchi" of Aliano, in the Italian region of Basilicata

In Italy, badlands are called "calanchi". Some examples are Aliano (Basilicata), Crete Senesi (Tuscany) and Civita di Bagnoregio (Lazio).

==== Spain ====
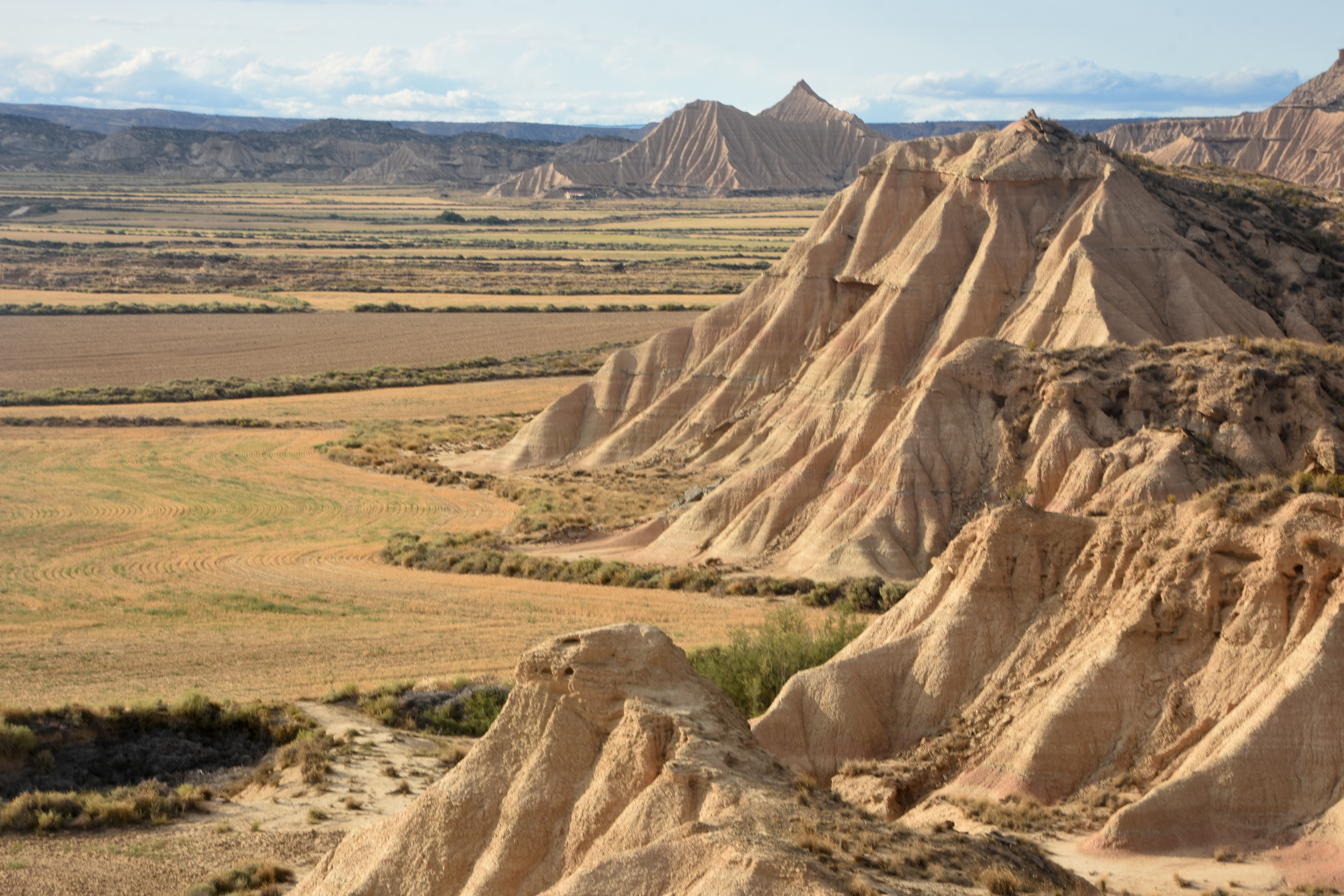
Bárdenas Reales, Navarre, Spain

The Bardenas Reales near Tudela, Navarre, the Tabernas Desert in Tabernas, Almería, parts of the Granada Altiplano near Guadix and possibly Los Monegros in Aragon are examples of Spanish badlands.

==== Turkey ====
Turkey has extensive badlands, including Göreme National Park.

=== North America ===
==== Canada ====
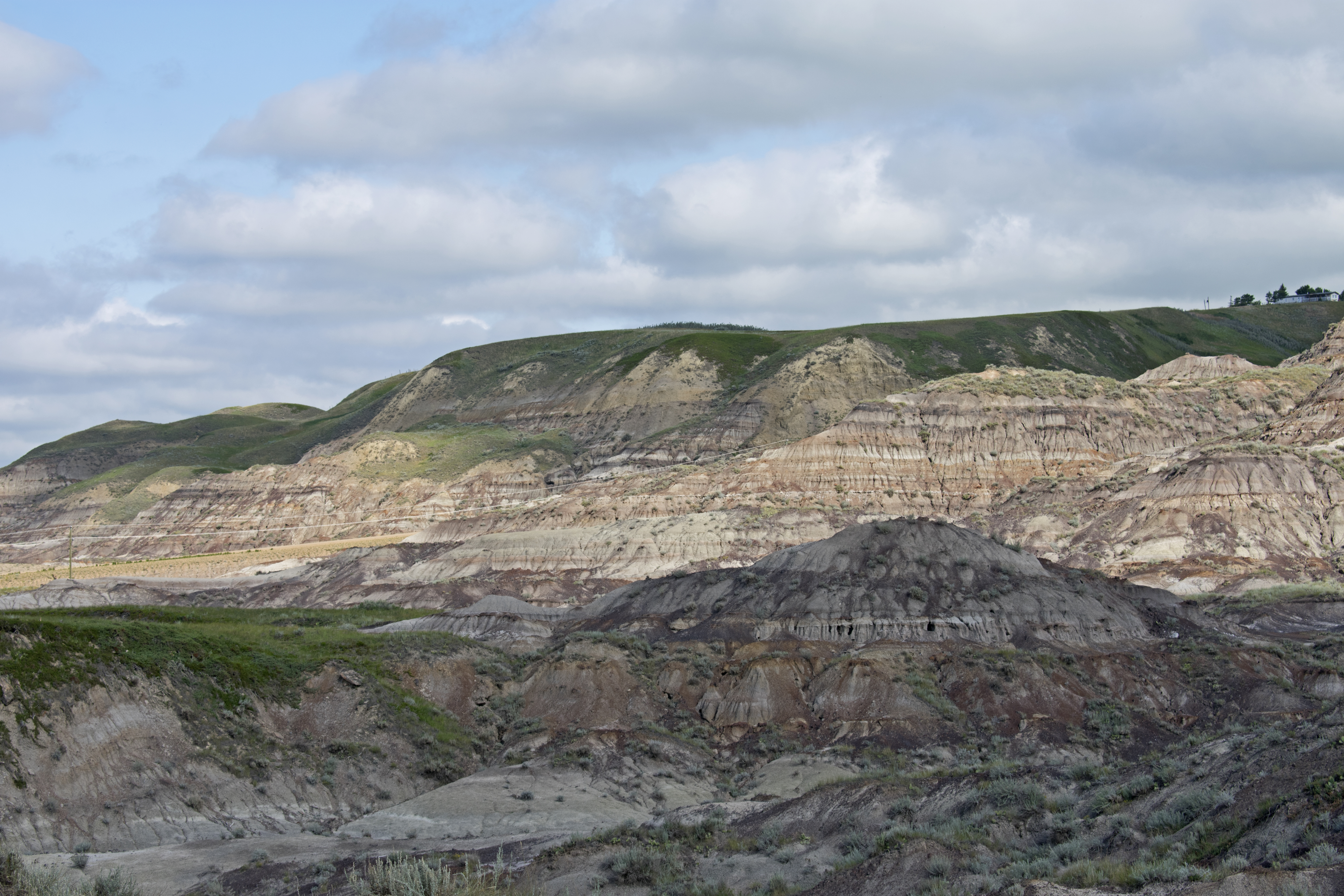
Drumheller, Alberta, Canada

The Cheltenham Badlands are in Caledon, Ontario, not far from Canada's largest city, Toronto.

The Big Muddy Badlands in Saskatchewan gained notoriety as a hideout for outlaws. Also in Saskatchewan are the Rock Creek Badlands in the East Block of Grasslands National Park.

There is a large badland area in Alberta, particularly in the valley of the Red Deer River, where Dinosaur Provincial Park is located, as well as in Drumheller, where the Royal Tyrrell Museum of Palaeontology is located.

==== United States ====
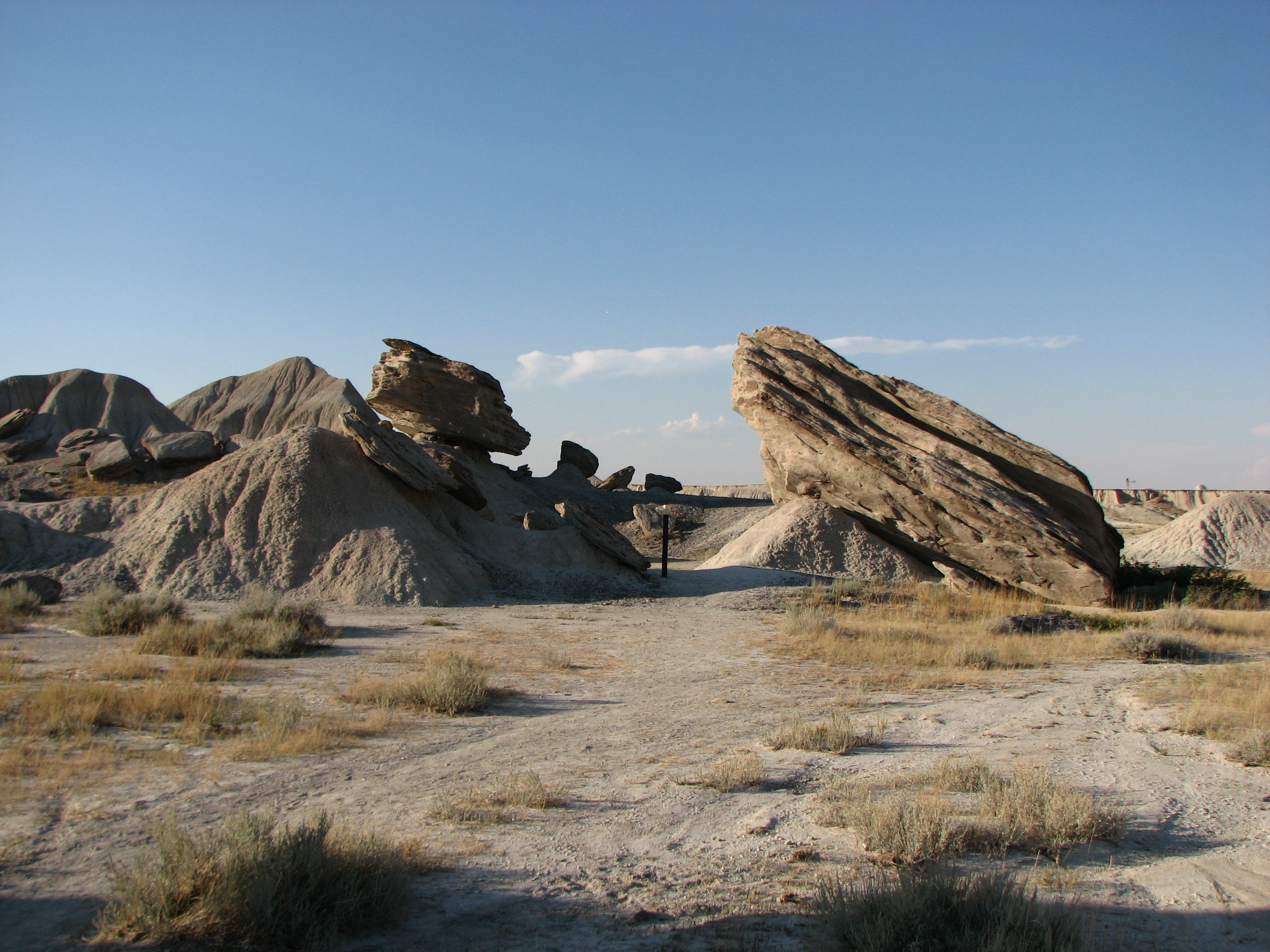
Toadstool Geologic Park, Nebraska, U.S.

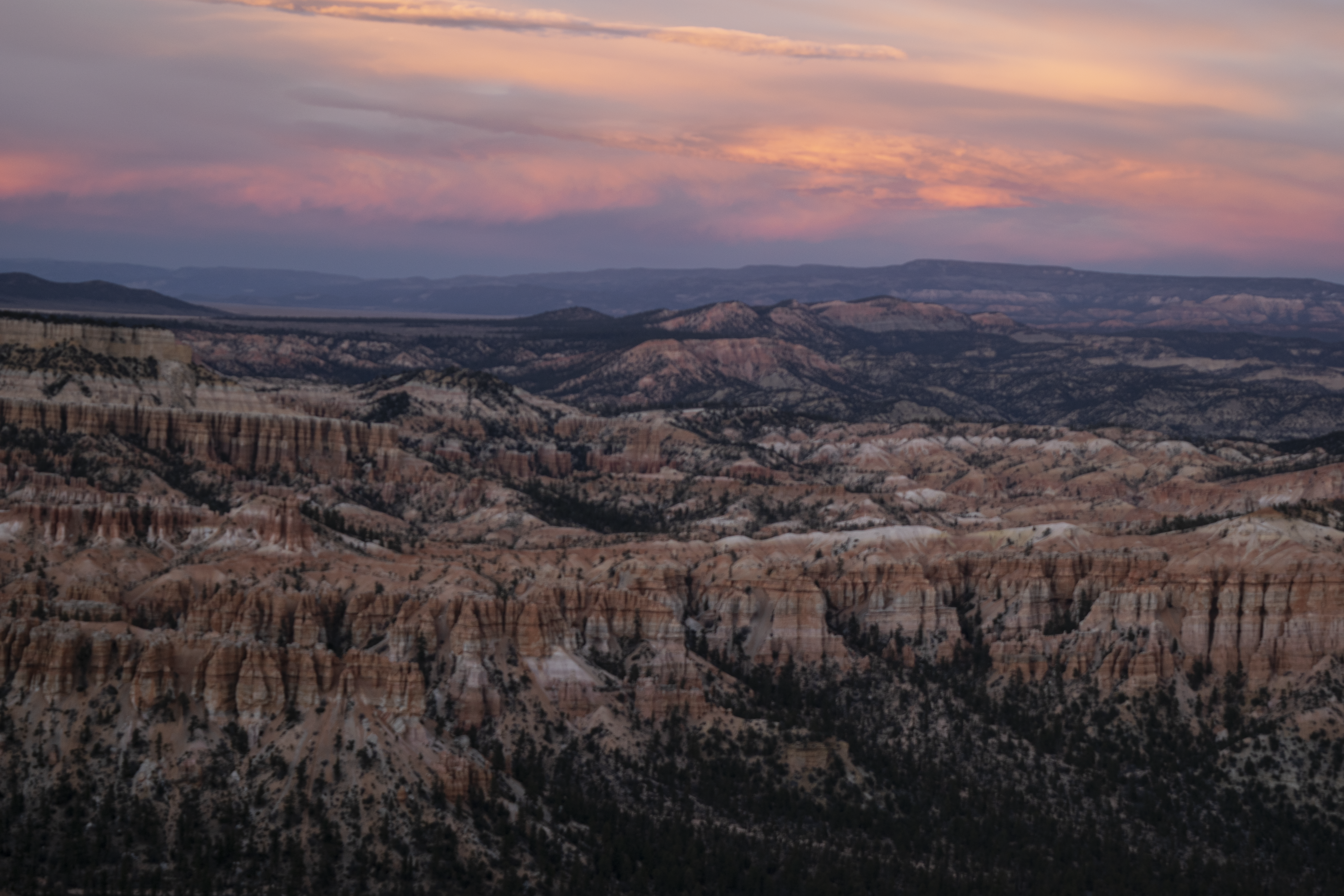
Bryce Canyon National Park, Utah, U.S.

In the U.S., Makoshika State Park in Montana and Badlands National Park in South Dakota are quite conspicuous examples of extensive badland formations; also located throughout this region are the three component sites of Theodore Roosevelt National Park, an assemblage of badlands in western North Dakota named after longtime part-time resident and former U.S. President Theodore Roosevelt. Nearby in eastern Montana are the Terry Badlands. Petrified Forest National Park in Arizona also encompasses numerous badlands. These areas have also come to serve as significant sources of paleontological and geological research samples.

Another popular area of badland formations is Toadstool Geologic Park in the Oglala National Grassland located in northwestern Nebraska. Dinosaur National Monument in Colorado and Utah are also badlands settings, along with several other areas in southern Utah, such as the Chinle Badlands in Grand Staircase–Escalante National Monument. A small badland called Hell's Half-Acre is present in Natrona County, Wyoming. Additional badlands also exist in various places throughout southwest Wyoming, such as near Pinedale and in the Bridger Valley near the towns of Lyman and Mountain View, near the high Uintah Mountains. Pinnacles National Park in California also has areas of badlands, as does the Mojave Desert in eastern California.

=== Oceanic islands ===
==== New Zealand ====
A well-known badlands formation in New Zealand – the Pūtangirua Pinnacles, formed by the erosion of the conglomerate of an old alluvial fan – is located at the head of a small valley near the southern tip of the North Island.

=== South America ===
==== Argentina ====
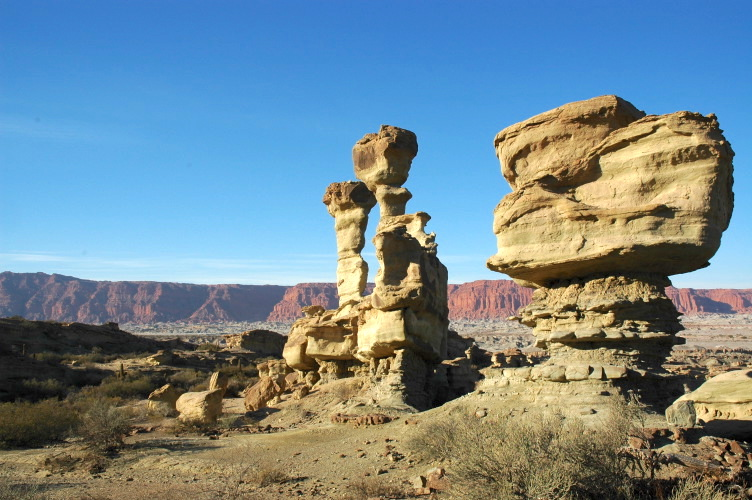
Valle de la Luna, San Juan, Argentina

The Valle de la Luna ("Valley of the Moon") is one of many examples of badland formations in midwestern Argentina.

== Culture and media ==
Badlands have become a popular trope inside various media, particularly westerns.

== Image gallery ==
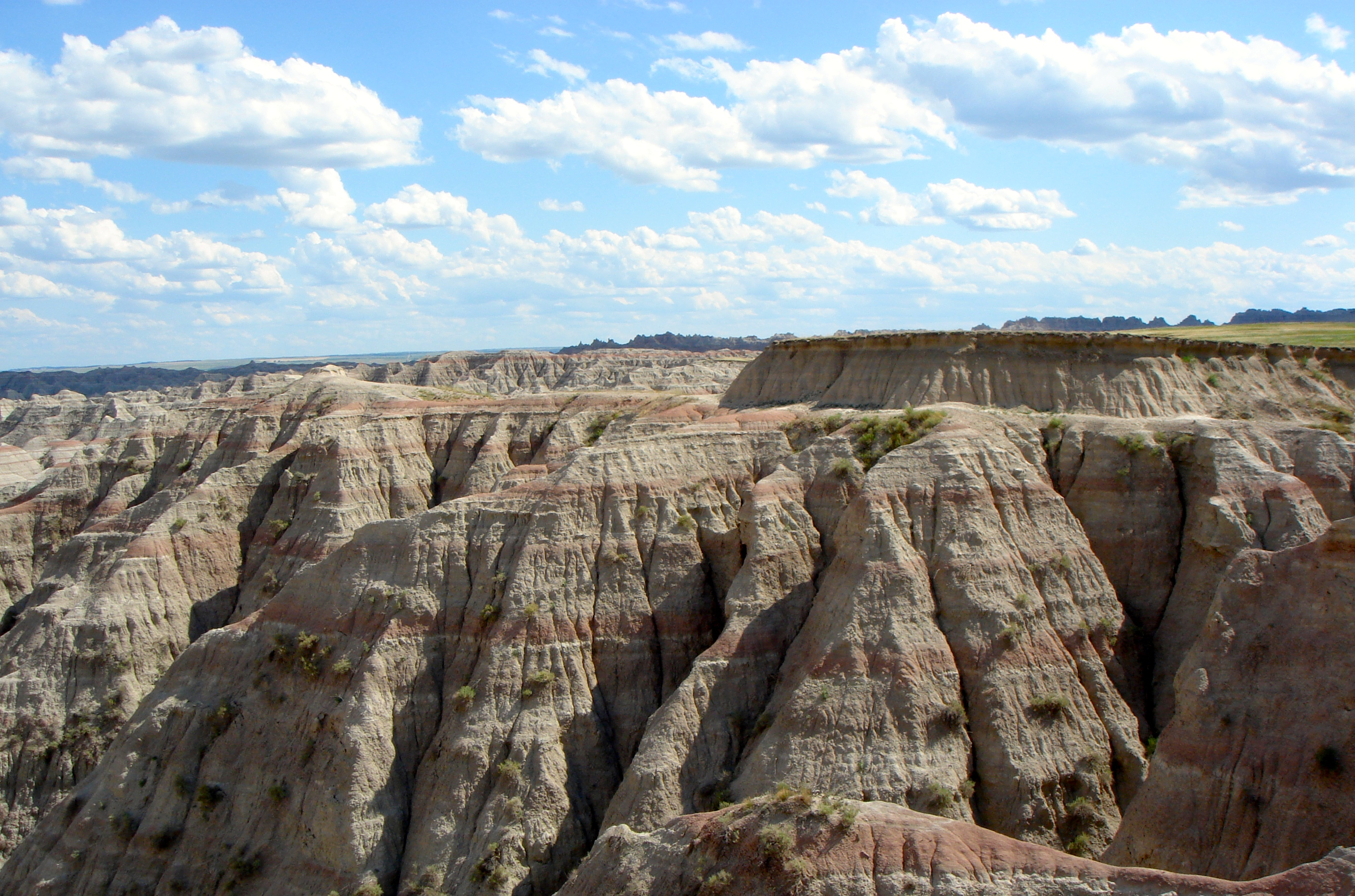
Badlands National Park, South Dakota, U.S.

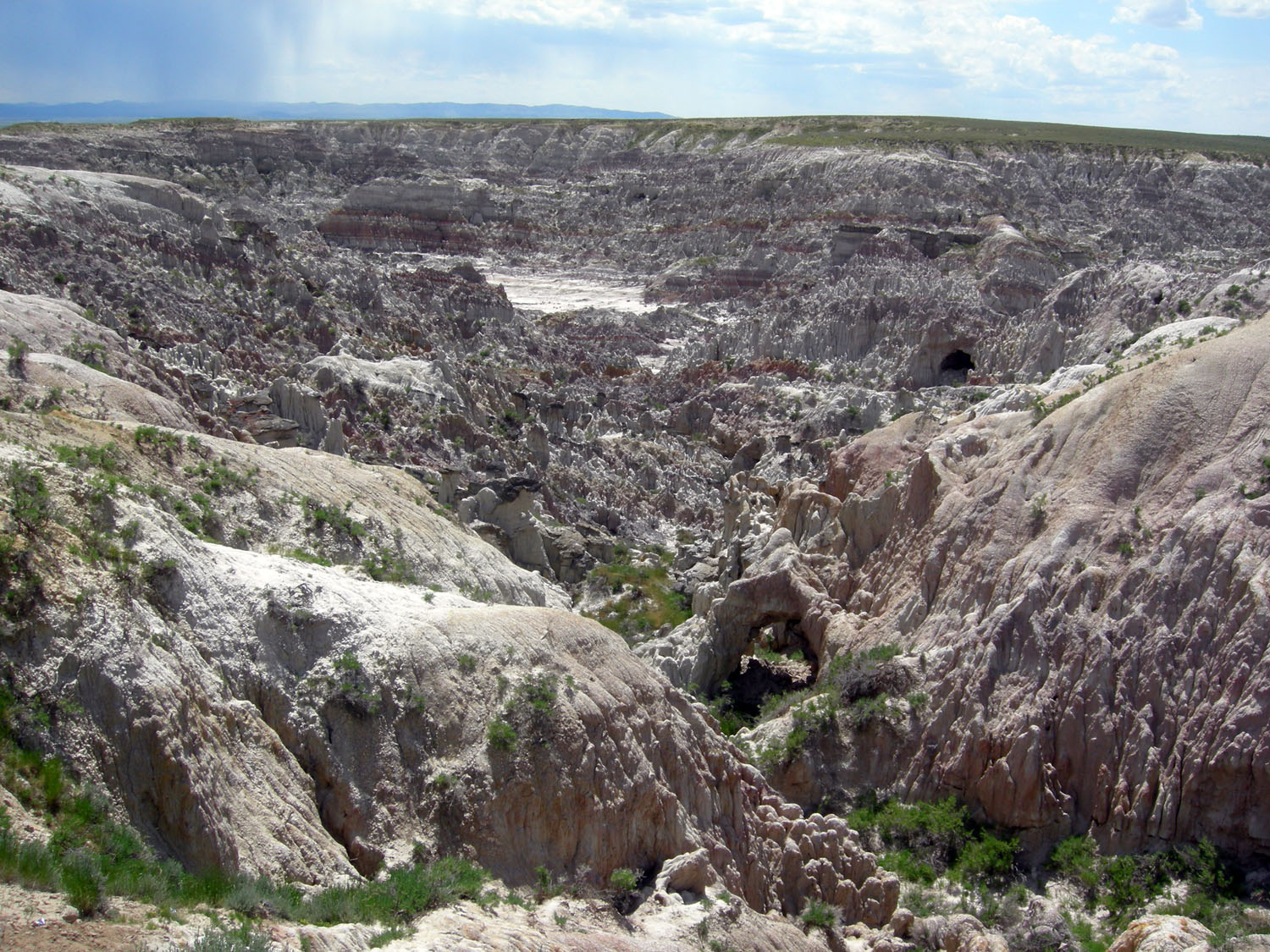
Hell's Half-Acre, Wyoming, U.S.

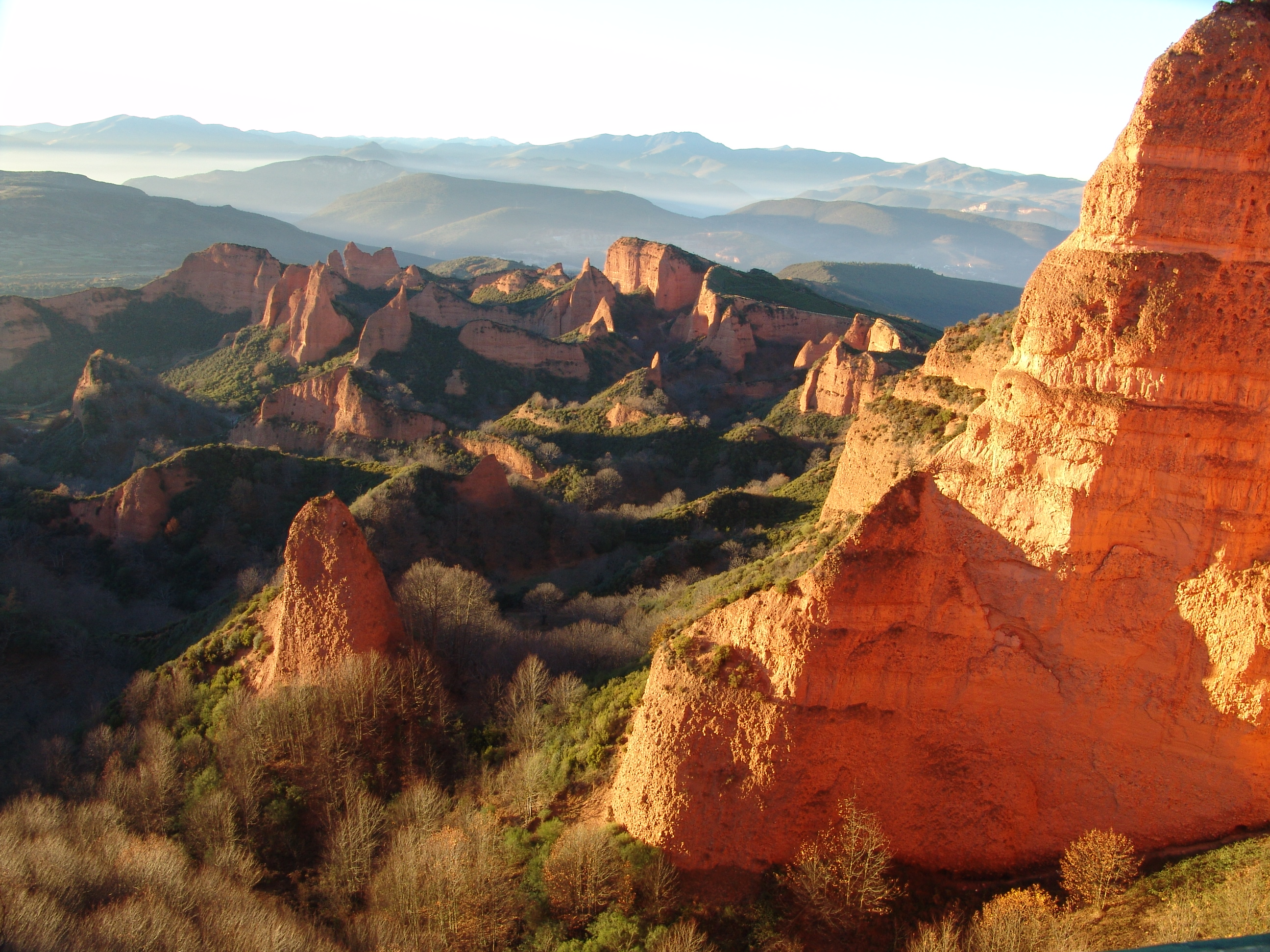
Las Médulas, León, Spain

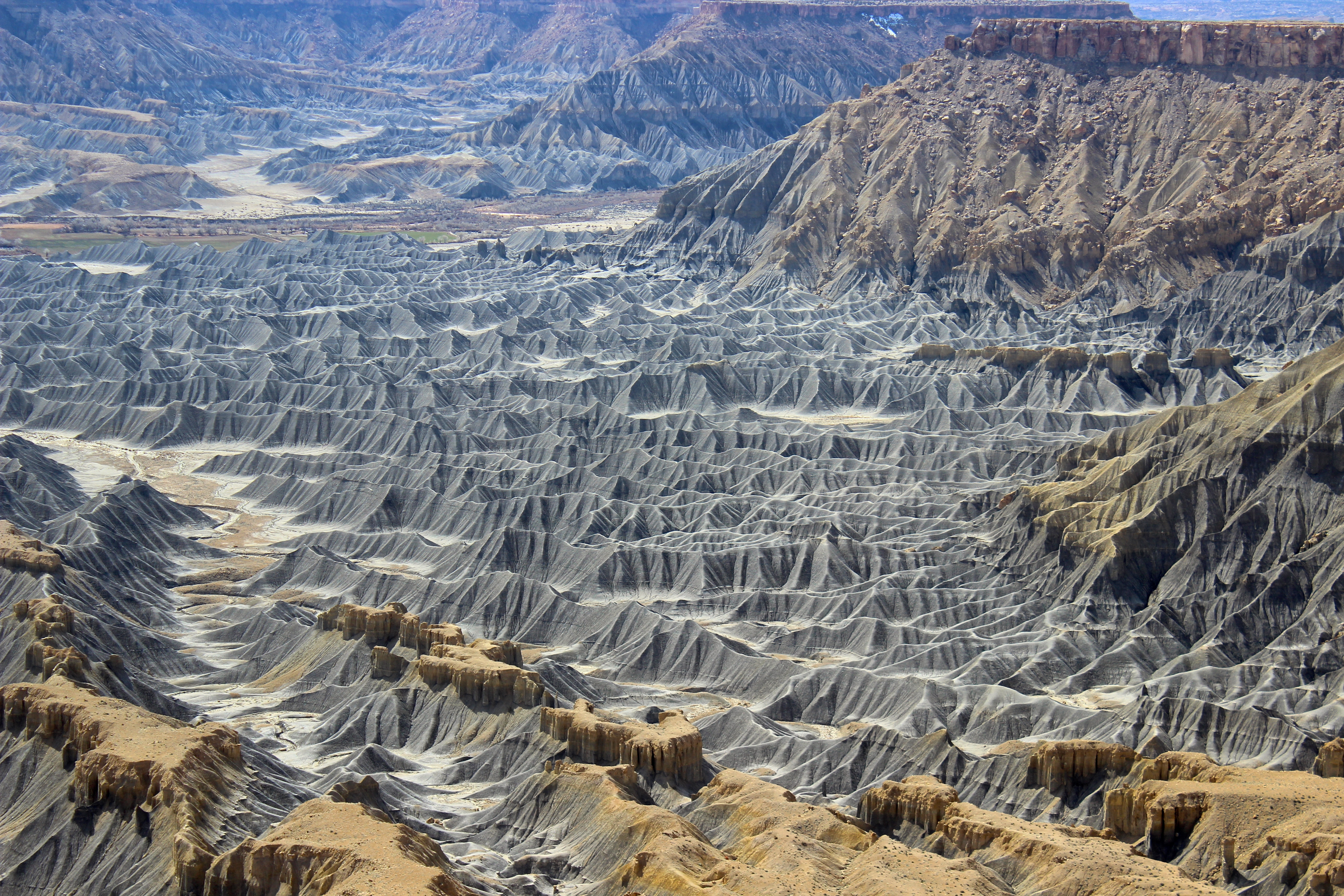
Badlands near the Fremont River in Utah, U.S.

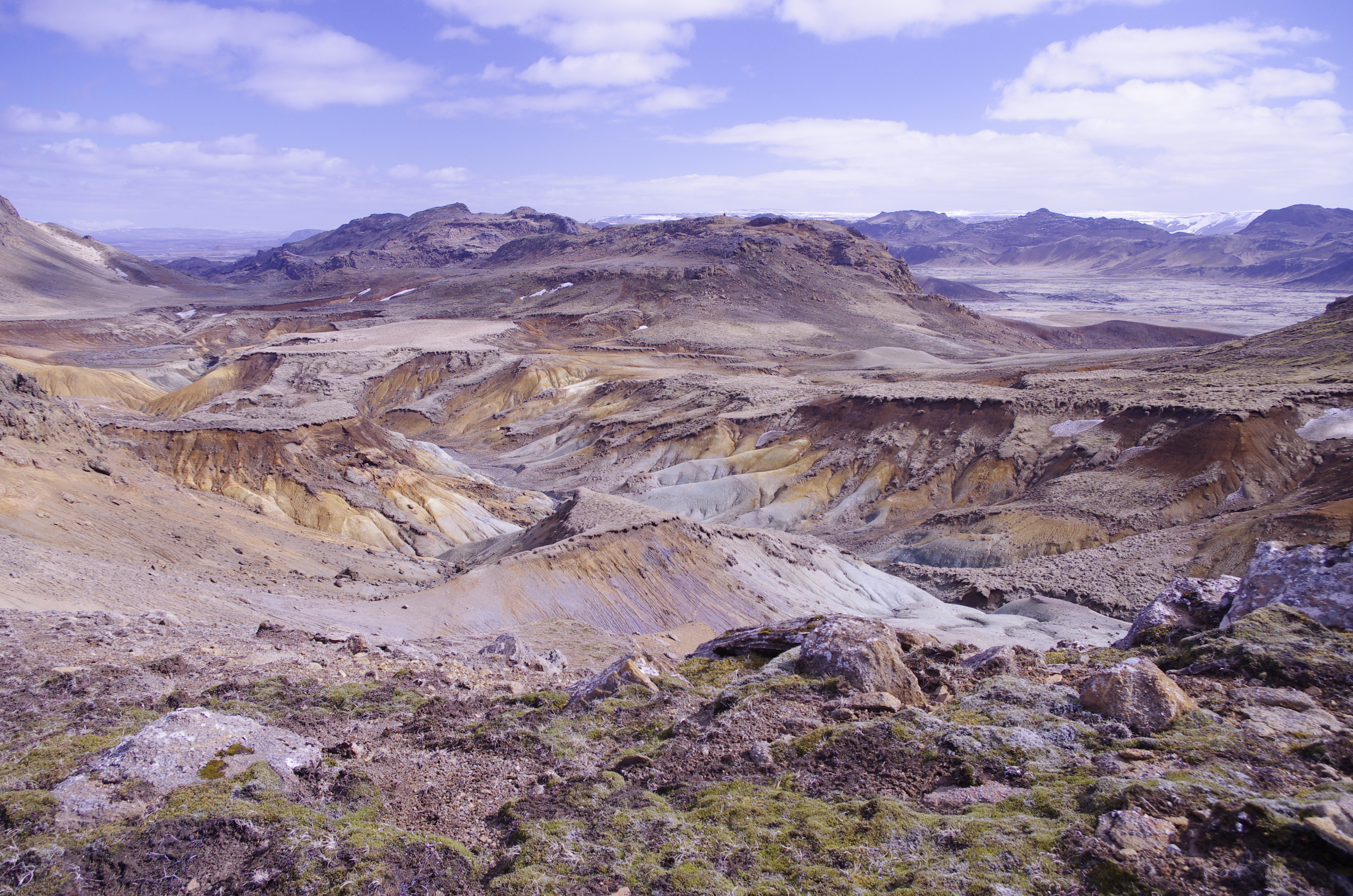
Vigdísarvallavegur, Southern Peninsula, Iceland

== See also ==
- Earth forest
- Tsingy de Bemaraha Strict Nature Reserve
- Calanque – Narrow inlet on the Mediterranean coast
- Death Valley – Valley in the Mojave Desert, Eastern California
