= Storey (surname) =

Storey is a surname. Notable people with the surname include:

== A ==
- Alastair Storey (born 1953), Scottish businessman
- Arthur G. Storey (1915–2005), Canadian writer
- Awvee Storey (born 1977), American basketball player and assistant coach

== B ==
- Barney Storey (born 1977), British cyclist
- Barron Storey (born 1940), American illustrator, graphic novelist and educator
- Ben Storey (born 1977), Canadian ice hockey player
- Ben Storey (rower) (born 1974), Canadian lightweight rower
- Bob Storey (born 1945), Canadian football player
- Bobby Storey (1956–2020), Irish republican
- Brett Storey (born 1977), English footballer
- Brian Storey (born 1971), Canadian competitive sailor

== C ==
- Cecile Storey (1933–1997), Australian teacher, lobbyist, internationalist and feminist
- Charles Ambrose Storey (1888–1968}, British Arabist and academic
- Ciara Storey, Irish camogie player
- Cuthbert Storey (born 1878), English footballer

== D ==
- Daniel Storey, British journalist and author
- David Storey (1933–2017), English rugby league player, playwright and writer
- David Storey (politician) (1856–1924), Australian politician and businessman
- Dominic Storey (born 1989), New Zealand racing driver
- Doris Storey (1919–2005), English swimmer, married name Doris Quarmby
- Dudley Storey (1939–2017), New Zealand rower

== E ==
- Edith Storey (1892–1967), American actress of the silent film era
- Elsdon Storey, Australian neurologist
- Edward Storey, (1930–2018), English poet, dramatist and non-fiction writer
- Edward Farris Storey (1829–1860), Nevada settler
- Ellsworth Storey (1879–1960), American architect
- Emy Storey (born 1981), American-Canadian director, graphic designer and illustrator
- Ernest Storey, English football goalkeeper

== F ==
- Fred Storey (1932–2019), Canadian curler

== G ==
- Geoff Storey (1904–c.1975), Australian rugby union player
- George Storey, British rugby league footballer
- George Adolphus Storey (1834–1919), English painter and illustrator
- Gerard Storey (born 2002), Irish association footballer
- Gerry Storey (born 1936), Northern Ireland boxing trainer
- Gilbert Storey (1899–1987), Australian association football player

== H ==
- Haddon Storey (born 1930), Australian politician
- Hedley Vicars Storey (1870–1929), British bookseller and author
- Helen Storey, British artist and designer
- Herbert Storey (1853–1933), English businessman

== I ==
- Ian Storey, English tenor
- Ian Storey-Moore (born 1945), English footballer

== J ==
- Jack Storey (footballer) (born 1929), Australian rules footballer
- Jeffrey Storey (born 1960), American business executive
- Jim Storey (born 1929), English footballer
- John Storey (politician) (1869–1921), Australian politician, premier of New South Wales
- John Storey (rower) (born 1987), New Zealand Olympic rower
- John D. Storey, American scientist
- Jordan Storey (born 1997), English footballer
- Joseph Storey (1923–1975), Canadian architect
- June Storey (1918–1991), American film actress

== K ==
- Kate Storey, British developmental biologist
- Keith Storey (rugby union) (1912–1998), Australian rugby union player
- Keith Storey (footballer) (1905–1979), Australian rules footballer
- Kenneth B. Storey (born 1949), Canadian scientist

== L ==
- Leonidas Jefferson Storey (1834–1909), American politician and military officer
- Lewis Storey (born 1950), American singer-songwriter and musician
- Llewelyn Robert Owen Storey (born 1927), British physicist
- Lora Storey (born 1989), Australian middle-distance runner

== M ==
- Marcus Storey (born 1982), American soccer player
- Margaret Storey (children's writer) (1926–2022), writer of children's and young adult stories
- Margaret Storey (mystery writer) (born c.1927), mystery writer, sometimes in collaboration with Jill Staynes as Elizabeth Eyre
- Margaret Hamilton Storey (1900–1960), American museum curator, herpetologist and ichthyologist
- Margaret-Anne Storey, Canadian computer scientist
- Martin Storey (born 1964), Irish hurler
- Martin Storey (politician) (died 2015), Channel Islander politician
- Matt Storey, British politician
- Maude Storey (1930–2003), British nurse, nursing administrator and writer
- Merv Storey (1913–1977), Australian rules footballer
- Mervyn Storey (born 1964), Northern Ireland politician
- Mickey Storey (born 1986), American baseball pitcher and manager
- Mike Storey (born 1949), British politician
- Miles Storey (born 1994), English footballer
- Moorfield Storey (1845–1929), American lawyer, anti-imperial activist and civil rights leader
- Murita Storey (born 1995), American soccer player

== N ==
- Norm Storey (1936—2023), Australian rugby union player

== P ==
- Pat Storey (born 1960), Irish Anglican bishop
- Percy Storey (1897–1975), New Zealand rugby union player
- Peter Storey (1945–2026), English footballer
- Ptosha Storey (born 1968), American actress and stage director

== R ==
- Raine Storey (born 1995), Canadian artist
- Raymond Storey (born 1956), Canadian playwright and television writer
- Red Storey (1918–2006), Canadian multi-sport athlete, referee and broadcaster
- Richard Storey (born 1937), British businessman
- Rob Storey (William Robson Storey, born 1936), New Zealand politician
- Rob Storey (Home and Away), fictional character in the Australian soap opera Home and Away
- Robbie Storey (born 1999), English rugby league footballer
- Robert H. Storey (born 1942), Canadian bobsledder
- Robert D. Storey (born 1936), American lawyer and philanthropist
- Robert G. Storey (1893–1981), American lawyer at the Nuremberg trials
- R. L. Storey (1927–2005), English historian
- Ruth Storey (1913–1997), American actress

== S ==
- Sally Storey, British architectural lighting designer
- Sam Storey (born 1963), boxer from Northern Ireland
- Samuel Story (1752–1811), vice admiral of the Batavian Republic Navy
- Samuel Storey (Liberal politician) (1841–1925), British politician and newspaper proprietor
- Samuel Storey, Baron Buckton (1896–1978), British Conservative politician, grandson of the Liberal politician
- Sarah Storey (born 1977), British cyclist and swimmer
- Sean Storey (born 1971), English snooker player
- Sid Storey (1919–2010), English footballer
- Simon Storey (born 1982), Australian association footballer
- Stephanie Storey, American actress, director and writer
- Steve Storey (born 1964), Australian cricketer
- Stewart Storey (born 1941), English cricketer
- Stuart Storey (born 1942), British hurdler and sports commentator
- Sydney Storey (1896–1966), Australian politician
- Sylvia Storey (1889–1947), British actress and dancer

== T ==
- Thomas Storey (1871–1953), Australian politician
- Tom Storey (born 1914), English footballer

== W ==
- Wallace L. Storey (1928–2007), American politician
- Wilbur F. Storey (1819–1884), American journalist and newspaper publisher
- W. A. Storey (William A. Storey, 1854–1917), mayor of Portland, Oregon, U.S. 1899–1900
- William Benson Storey (1857–1940), American railroad executive
- W. D. Storey (1830–1914), English-born American judge, lawyer, and district attorney
- William John Storey (born 1978), British businessman

== See also ==
- Storey (disambiguation)
- Story (surname)
