= National Register of Historic Places listings in Sioux County, Nebraska =

Location of Sioux County in Nebraska

Sioux County, Nebraska, United States, has seven properties and districts listed on the National Register of Historic Places.

This National Park Service list is complete through NPS recent listings posted October 30, 2026.

== Current listings ==
	Name on the Register	Image	Date listed	Location	City or town	Description
1	Agate Fossil Beds National Monument	Agate Fossil Beds National Monument	October 30, 2013 (#12001126)	4641 Highway 29; 42°25′15″N 103°47′38″W	Harrison	Previously the Agate Springs Ranch
2	Harold J. Cook Homestead Cabin	Harold J. Cook Homestead Cabin	August 24, 1977 (#77000156)	3 miles east of Agate off Nebraska Highway 29 on the Agate Fossil Beds National Monument; 42°25′05″N 103°44′21″W	Agate	Also known as Bone Cabin.
3	Fort Robinson and Red Cloud Agency	Fort Robinson and Red Cloud Agency	October 15, 1966 (#66000442)	2 miles west of Crawford; 42°40′02″N 103°27′13″W	Crawford	Extends into Dawes County
4	Hudson-Meng Bison Kill Site	Hudson-Meng Bison Kill Site	August 28, 1973 (#73001076)	Sand Creek Rd., northwest of Crawford; 42°49′43″N 103°36′06″W	Crawford	
5	Sandford Dugout		March 9, 2000 (#00000166)	25 miles (40 km) north of Mitchell and 2 miles (3.2 km) west of Nebraska Highway 29	Mitchell	
6	Sioux County Courthouse	Sioux County Courthouse	July 5, 1990 (#90000963)	Northeastern corner of Main and 3rd Sts. 42°41′20″N 103°53′00″W	Harrison	
7	Wind Springs Ranch Historic and Archeological District		November 22, 2000 (#00001403)	Wind Springs Creek Valley; 42°04′33″N 103°39′53″W	Scottsbluff	

== See also ==
- List of National Historic Landmarks in Nebraska
- National Register of Historic Places listings in Nebraska
