= 1914 in association football =

The following are the football (soccer) events of the year 1914 throughout the world.

== Events ==
- February 8 – The Luxembourg has its first victory, beating France 5–4 in a friendly match. It was the only time France failed to beat Luxembourg in football history until 2017.
- The only edition of the Vienna Cup, the first European cup competition, is won by the Glentoran of Northern Ireland.
- Woolwich Arsenal are renamed Arsenal.
- Palmeiras is founded as SS Palestra Italia.
- PFC Levski Sofia is founded on May 24.
- Portuguese Football Federation is founded, as Portuguese Football Union, on 31 March.
- Reggina Calcio is founded.

== Winners club national championship ==
- Argentina: Racing Club, Estudiantiles Porteño
- Austria: Wiener AF
- Belgium: Daring CB
- Denmark: Kjøbenhavns Boldklub
- England: Blackburn Rovers
- France: Olympique Lillois
- Germany: SpVgg Fürth
- Hungary: MTK Hungária FC
- Iceland: Fram
- Italy: Casale
- Netherlands: H.V.V.
- Paraguay: Olimpia
- Scotland: For fuller coverage, see 1913-14 in Scottish football.
  - Scottish Division One – Celtic
  - Scottish Division Two – Cowdenbeath
  - Scottish Cup – Celtic
- Sweden: AIK
- United States: The oldest club trophy soccer competition in the Americas, Lamar Hunt U.S. Open Cup, is founded as National Challenge Cup and the Brooklyn Field Club (1898-1924) are the first champions.
- Uruguay: CA River Plate
- Greece: 1913 to 1921 - no championship titles due to the First World War and the Greco-Turkish War of 1919-1922.

== International tournaments ==
- 1914 British Home Championship (January 19, 1914 – April 4, 1914)

Ireland

== Births ==
- June 10 – Hans Klodt, German international footballer (died 1996)
- June 23 – Juán Landolfi, Argentine-Italian footballer (died unknown)
- July 16 – August Lešnik, Croatian footballer (died 1992)
- July 18 – Oscar Heisserer, French international (died 2004)
- July 19 – César Povolny, German-born French footballer (died unknown)
- July 29 – Jock Smeaton, Scottish professional footballer (died 1984)
- August 26 – Atilio García, Argentine-Uruguayan footballer (died 1973)
- November 23 – Tom Storey, English professional footballer (died ?)
- December 18 – František Fadrhonc, Czech football manager (died 1981)

== Deaths ==
- April 19 - Morton Betts, English footballer and cricketer
