= Story (surname) =

The surname Story (and its variant spelling Storey) is English, but Old Norse in origin. The name originates from the Old Norse personal epithet “Stóri”, a derivative of “Storr” which means “large” or “big”. It has been established that the root of the name is “Storr”. The suffix “ey[e]” is equivalent to the Icelandic “ig” and signifies “water”. “Storr” also denotes large in the sense of vast and rough. Rigbeye's assumption, therefore, is that “Stor(e)y” means "dweller by large and rough water". This may be explained by the Norse affinity to sea exploration, or the fact that the first Storys settled near the Lake District, and so the name might refer to the habitation which they chose. The earliest Norse settlement of which the first Storys would have been a part, took place in the 9th century north of Carlisle near the Solway Firth. This area then known as Strathclyde, was situated in the northwestern part of England, along the Scottish border. The earliest Storys would have settled on the English side of the border, most likely in the plains along the river Eden. The English or Anglo-Saxon population, among whom the Norse settled, spoke a similar language but pronounced many words in a different way. So, “Storr” among the Norse would have been enunciated as “Styr” in English.

== History ==
One of the earliest mentions of the name is “Styr (Saxon for Stor) who gave the manor of Durham with other places to the Abbot of Lindisfarne in the year 999 A.D.” (Symeonis Dunelmensis, vol I, pp. 150–154.) The forenames Stori and Estori (without surname) are recorded in the Domesday Book of 1086 (Derbyshire), a survey of England conducted for William the Conqueror. Those who bore such names were of Norse blood. (The Scandinavian "Stor", "Stori" and "Storius" occur prior to Domesday Survey.) Afterwards, the name can be traced down in the Northern English counties, particularly Yorkshire. The surname Story is first found in the 1248 Feet of Fines or Fine Court Rolls of Essex, and shows to be that of a certain Alexander (Essex Arch. Soc. 4 Vols, 1899–1964). A “Reginaldus filius [son of] Story” is mentioned in the Assize Court Rolls of Yorkshire (1219) (York Arch. Soc. 44, 100, 1911, 1939; Seldon Soc. 56, 1937). The surname from this source is first recorded circa 1250. Other spellings of the name are Stori (William, 1281), with Storre and Staury, the 1379 Poll Tax Returns Records of Yorkshire. More examples of various spellings include: Alan le Storeys 1272, Ricus Stury or Storey 1350, Johannes Storey, Rector of Richmondshire 1429, Dr Edward Storey or Story 1464, John Story 1476, Nicholas Storie of Liddesdale 1590, Thomas Story of Wall 1666.

During the reign of Edward I (1272 to 1307), the kingdoms of England and Scotland went to war, and for the next 300 years, the Storys found themselves entangled in the Border wars between the two kingdoms. A coat of arms was bestowed on the family by (or during the reign of) Richard II of England (reigned 1377–1399). It shows a shield with a blazon of argent (silver) thereupon a lion rampant double queued (two-tailed) purple charged on its shoulder with a so-called “cross pattée” in argent (silver), the crest consisting of the face of a leopard out of a ducal crown (coronet). A bloody feud between the Stor(e)ys and Grahams in the 16th century, forced many family members to migrate eastward from the region surrounding the city of Carlisle, to Northumberland in the east.

== People ==
The name may refer to many people:

- Alex Wolfman Story (born 1974), American musician, author, performer
- Alfred Thomas Story (1842–1934), English journalist, poet and author of numerous books
- Belle Story (c. 1887–?), American vaudeville performer and singer
- Bonnie Story (born 1959), American Emmy Award-winning choreographer
- Carl Story (1916–1995), influential bluegrass musician and leader of the "Rambling Mountaineers"
- Dee Ann Story (1931–2010), American archaeologist
- Edward Story (15th century–1503), English Bishop
- Gertrude Story (1929–2014), Canadian writer and radio broadcaster
- George Warter Story (1664–1721), English clergyman
- Henri Story (1897–1944), Belgian businessman and liberal politician in Ghent
- Isabelle Story (1887–1970), American writer and editor
- Jack Trevor Story (1917–1991), British novelist
- John Story (1504–1571), English martyr
- John Douglas Story (1869–1966), Australian public servant
- Joseph Story (1779–1845), American Supreme Court jurist
- Karl Story (born 1967), American comic book artist
- Laura Story, American singer-songwriter from Spartanburg, South Carolina
- Liz Story (born 1956), American pianist
- Luther H. Story (1931–1950), American soldier and Medal of Honor recipient in the United States Army during the Korean War
- Marguerite Story (1922–2009), Speaker of the Legislative Assembly of the Cook Islands from 1965 to 1979
- Michael John Storey, Baron Storey (born 1949), British Liberal Democrat politician
- Nat Story (1904–1968), American jazz trombonist
- Nelson Story (1838–1926), American pioneer Montana entrepreneur, cattle rancher, miner and vigilante
- Owen Story (born 1987), English professional footballer
- Ralph Story (1920–2006), American radio and television personality
- Richard W. Story (born 1953), American federal judge
- Rick Story (born 1984), American mixed martial artist
- Robert Story (born 1952), American politician and Republican Party member of the Montana Senate
- Robert Herbert Story (1835–1907), Scottish Divine and Principal of the University of Glasgow
- Samuel Story (1752–1811), Dutch naval commander
- Thomas Story (1670–1742), English Quaker convert and friend of William Penn
- Thomas Waldo Story (1855–1915), English/American sculptor
- Tim Story (born 1970), American film director
- Trevor Story (born 1992), American baseball player
- Vernon Story (1922–2007), American jazz tenor saxophonist
- Walter Scott Story (1879–1955), American author
- William Wetmore Story (1819–1895), American sculptor, son of Joseph Story (above)
- Jeremy story (1979-
- Asah story (2009-
- Avery story (2010-
- John story (1949-

== See also ==
- Story (disambiguation)
- Storey (surname)
- Richie Story, ballad
- William Wetmore Story and His Friends, biography written by Henry James
