= Story =

Story or stories may refer to:

== Common uses ==
- Narrative, an account of imaginary or real people and events
  - Short story, a piece of prose fiction that typically can be read in one sitting
  - News story, an event or topic reported by a news organization
- Storey (also spelled story in American English), a floor or level of a building

== Social media ==
- Story (social media), a message, image or video, often ephemeral
  - Facebook Stories, short user-generated photo or video collections that can be uploaded to the user's Facebook
  - Instagram Stories, a feature in Instagram that let the user post vertical images that will disappear in 24 hours
  - Snapchat Stories, a feature in Snapchat which allows users to compile snaps into chronological storylines, accessible to all of their friends

== Film, television and radio ==
- Story Television, an American digital broadcast television network
- Story TV, a South Korean television drama production company
- TvN Story, a South Korean television channel
- Story (TV programme), a 2015–2016 New Zealand television programme
- Story, one of the main characters in the 2006 film Lady in the Water
- Kahaani, or Story, a 2012 Indian film by Sujoy Ghosh
- The Story (film documentary short), a 2000 short film by John Little
- The Story with Dick Gordon, a radio interview program that debuted in 2006
- "Stories", an episode of The Good Doctor

== Music ==
=== Groups ===
- The Story (American band), a 1989–1994 folk-rock duo
- The Story (British band), an English psychedelic folk duo formed in 2002
- Stories (band), a 1972–1974 American rock group

=== Albums ===
- Story (Amorphis album), 2000
- Story (Eric Clapton album), 1991
- Story: 25 Years of Hits, by Pet Shop Boys, 2009
- Story, by Honeybus, 1970
- Story, by NEWS, 2020
- Story, by Yesung, 2019
- A Story, by Yoko Ono (recorded 1974), or the title song, 1997
- The Story (Brandi Carlile album) or the title song (see below), 2007
- The Story (Kang Daniel album) or the title song, 2022
- The Story (Runrig album) or the title song, 2016
- The Story: The Very Best of Spandau Ballet, 2014
- The Story, by Bizzy Bone, 2006
- Stories (Addison Road album), 2010
- Stories (Avicii album), 2015
- Stories (The Bunny the Bear album), 2013
- Stories (Gloria Gaynor album), 1980
- Stories (Mayumi Iizuka album) or the title song, 2008
- Stories (Milford Graves album), 2000
- Stories (Randy Stonehill album), 1993
- Stories (EP), by Chris Brokaw, or the title song, 2011
- Stories, an EP by Aurora, 2021
- Stories, by John Mayall & the Bluesbreakers, 2002
- Stories, by various artists, released by Narada Productions

=== Songs ===
- "Story" (Ai song), 2005
- "Story" (Rina Aiuchi song), 2009
- "Story", by Drake White from Spark, 2016
- "Story", by Kylie Minogue from Tension, 2023
- "Story", by Leddra Chapman from Telling Tales, 2009
- "Story", by Maroon 5, a B-side of "Makes Me Wonder", 2007
- "Story", by NF from Clouds (The Mixtape), 2021
- "Story", by P-Square from Get Squared, 2005
- "Story", by Perfume from Cosmic Explorer, 2016
- "Story", by S.E.S. from A Letter from Greenland, 2000
- "The Story" (Brandi Carlile song), 2007
- "The Story" (Conan Gray song), 2020
- "The Story", by 30 Seconds to Mars from A Beautiful Lie, 2005
- "The Story", by Derrick Morgan
- "The Story", by Jewel, representing Alaska in the American Song Contest, 2022
- "The Story", by Limp Bizkit from The Unquestionable Truth (Part 1), 2005
- "The Story", by M.I.A. from AIM, 2016
- "The Story", by the Passions from Sanctuary, 2019 reissue
- "Stories" (Boney M. song), 1990
- "Stories" (Therapy? song), 1995
- "Stories", by MisterWives from Superbloom, 2020
- "Stories", by Paige O'Hara from Beauty and the Beast: The Enchanted Christmas, 1997
- "Stories", by Saint Motel from Voyeur, 2012
- "Stories", by Trapt from Trapt, 2002
- "SToRY" by Leo/Need, 2025

=== EPs ===
- Stories, by The Beast

== Places ==
=== Australia ===
- Story Bridge, Brisbane, Queensland

=== United States ===
- Story, Arkansas, an unincorporated community
- Story, Indiana, an unincorporated community
- Story, Nebraska, an unincorporated community
- Story, Wyoming, a census-designated place
- Joint Expeditionary Base Fort Story, an army base in Virginia Beach, Virginia
- Story City, Iowa
- Story County, Iowa
- Story station planned light-rail station in San Jose, California scheduled to open in 2029

== People ==
- Story (surname)
- Story Musgrave (born 1935), American doctor and astronaut
- Story Tweedie-Yates (born 1983), professional American tennis player

== Other uses ==
- Story (magazine), an American literary magazine published 1931–1961 and 1989–2000
- Story (restaurant), in London
- Story: Substance, Structure, Style and the Principles of Screenwriting, a 1997 screenwriting guide by Robert McKee
- JKT48 Story, an Indonesian variety show
- The Stories, by Jane Gardam, 2014
- User story, a planning activity in software development
- Ray-Ban Stories, smartglasses released in September 2021
- Story (floor), another term for floors of a building

== See also ==
- History (disambiguation)
- Storey (disambiguation)
