= Orella =

Orella may refer to:

- Orella, India, a village and panchayat in Ranga Reddy district
- Orella, Nebraska, a community in the United States

== See also ==
- Orilla
