= Margaret Storey =

Margaret Storey may refer to:

- Margaret Storey (children's writer) (1926–2022), writer of children's and young adult stories, including the Melinda Farbright series
- Margaret Storey (mystery writer) (born c. 1927), mystery writer, sometimes in collaboration with Jill Staynes as Elizabeth Eyre
- Margaret Hamilton Storey (1900–1960), American biologist
