= Become =

Become could refer to:

- Becoming (philosophy)
- Become (EP), by Beach House (2023)
- Become, an album by Seventh Wonder (2005)

== See also ==
- Becoming (disambiguation)
- The Becoming (disambiguation)
