= George Storey (disambiguation) =

George Storey may refer to:

- George Storey (footballer) (Christopher George Storey 1877–1923), English footballer, see List of Bury F.C. players (1–24 appearances)
- George Adolphus Storey (1834–1919), English artist
- George Storey, Rugby league player

== See also ==
- George Story
