= Varley-Woods =

British Automobile

Varley-Woods was a British automotive marque. It was the creation of overseas trader John Robert Woods and Ernest Vernon Varley Grossmith, a member of a famous perfumery family. Due to anti-German sentiment following the end of World War I, Grossmith dropped his German sounding last name.

Varley founded the High Speed Tool Company in Acton, London. In late 1918, the company changed its name to HS Motors Ltd. HS Motors Ltd built an assembled car in 1918–1919, using Decolonge engines acquired from fellow manufacturer Storey.

In mid-1919, unpaid creditors took the company to court, and called-in the bailiffs. The bailiffs arrived at the factory, noted what was of value, and padlocked the premises, stating that if the bills were not paid within seven days, they would return and take everything away to be sold off.

Varley and Woods management arrived at the premises with a lorry, knocked a hole in the wall, and removed every item of value The equipment was transported to Wolverhampton. Car manufacture recommenced there, using chassis sourced from Turner, and Dorman 1794cc engines.

The Varley-Woods automobile was launched at the 1919 Motor Show at Olympia. There were three models, a 2-seater, priced at £540, a 4-seater tourer, priced at £660, and a coupé, priced at £760.

In 1920 2303cc Taylor engines replaced the Dorman engines, probably due to credit problems in paying Dorman. Prices were higher - the 2-seater was now priced at £695, the tourer at £725, and a limousine at £1,200. By late 1920, the company was unable to pay the rent on the Wolverhampton factory, and the Receiver was called in.

In total, Varley and Woods produced approximately 150 cars with Dorman engines and a very small number with Taylor engines.

After production ended, Varley moved to a cottage in Cornwall. while Woods travelled to Nyasaland, where he was killed by a lion.
