= George Story =

George Story may refer to:

- George Story (priest) (1664–1721), English clergyman
- George Story (politician) (1849–1931), member of the Queensland Legislative Assembly
- George Story (journalist) (1936-2000), the subject of both the first and last covers of Life Magazine.

== See also ==
- George Storey (disambiguation)
