= William James Armitage =

Canon William James Armitage
- Canon of All Saints Cathedral, Halifax
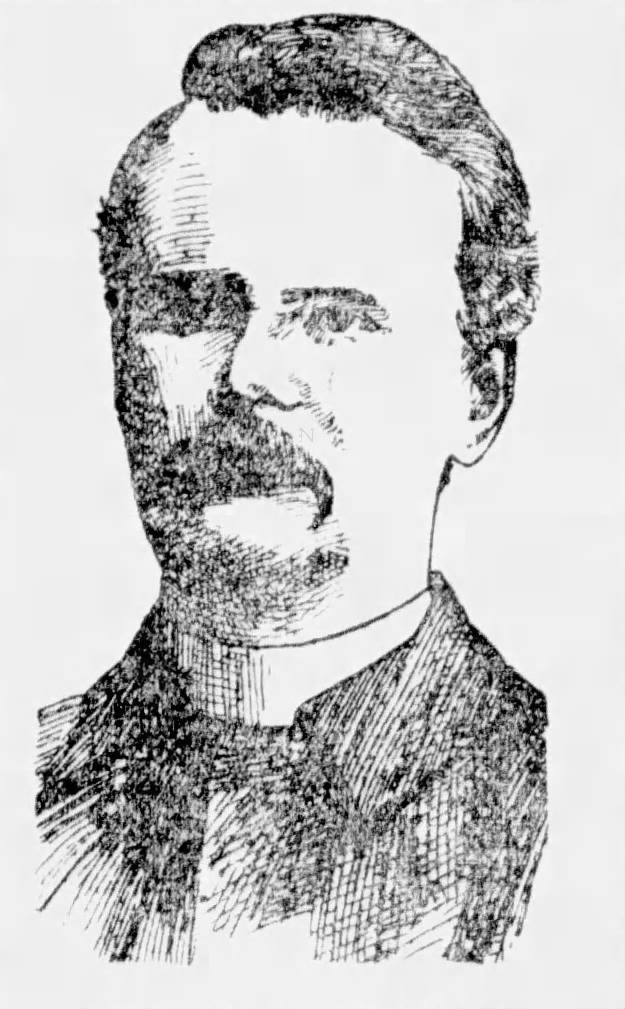
- Church: Anglican Church of Canada
- Diocese: Nova Scotia

Orders
- Ordination: 1880s

Personal details
- Born: William James Armitage; January 1, 1860 Canada
- Died: December 1, 1929
- Denomination: Anglicanism
- Residence: Halifax, Nova Scotia
- Education: Wycliffe College, Toronto, Dalhousie University, University of New Brunswick

William James Armitage (born Bryanston, Ontario, February 6, 1860 - 1929) was a prominent Anglican minister in Canada, holding the position of Archdeacon of Halifax for twenty-three years and canon of All Saints Cathedral for 22 years. He was also the rector of St. Paul's Church (Halifax).

== Career ==
Armitage studied divinity at Wycliffe College, Toronto, where he became a councilor and would return as a special lecturer throughout his career (and where his son Rev. Dr. W. R. Ramsay Armitage served as president). While in Toronto, Armitage became one of the founders and of Havergal Ladies' College, Toronto.

He then became curate of St. James' Church, Orilla, (1884-1885), when he was ordained deacon (1884) then priest (1885). He then became Rector of St. Thomas's Church, St. Catharines, Ontario for eleven years (1886-1897), where he was one of the founders of Ridley College, St. Catharine. During this time he also served as rural dean of Lincoln and Welland (1892-1895).

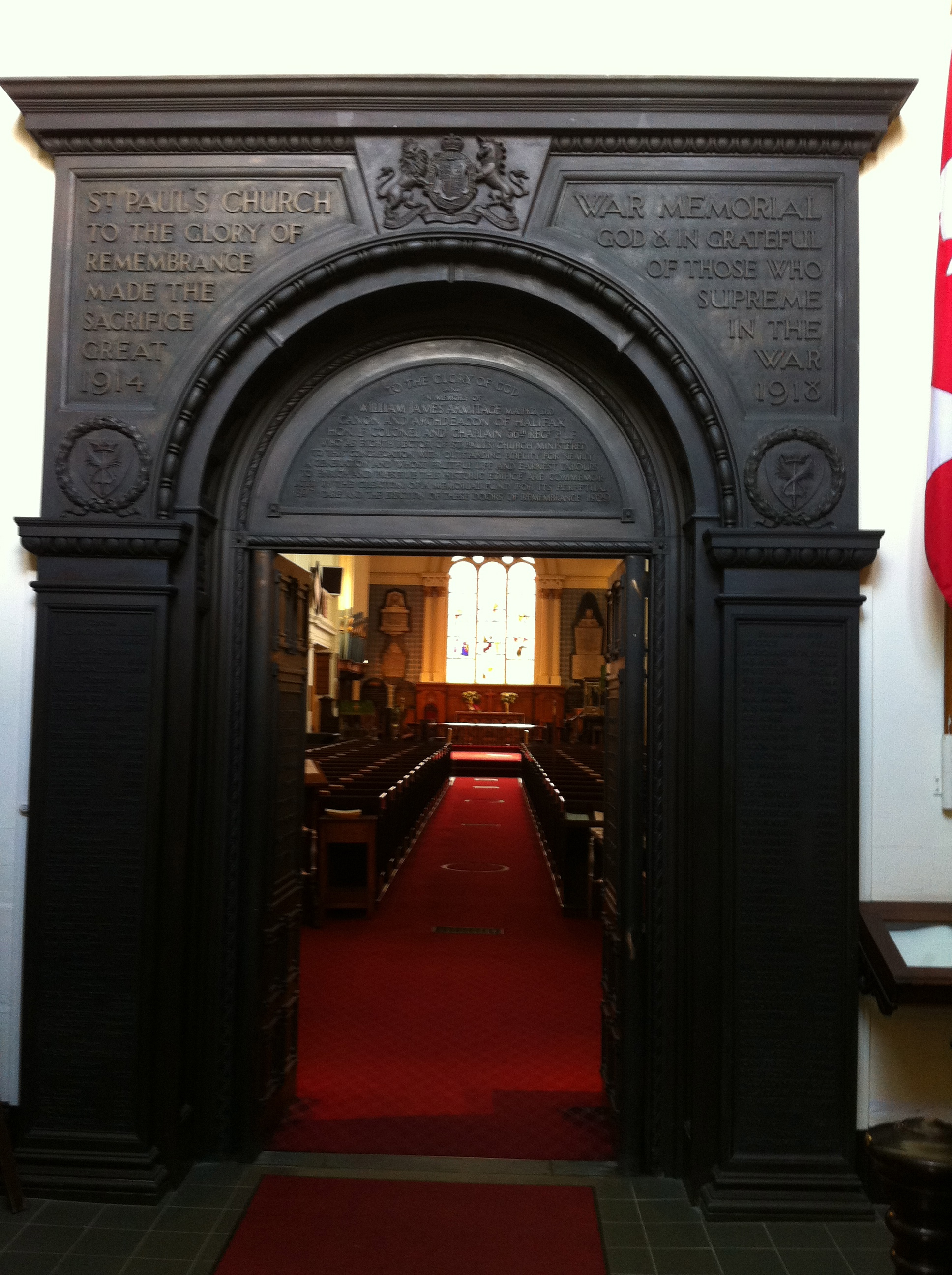
Armitage is commemorated on the Narthex-Nave Doorway, St Paul's Anglican Church, Halifax, Nova Scotia

In 1897, Armitage moved to Halifax, Nova Scotia, where he remained for 31 years until his death. He became rector of St. Paul's parish, Halifax (1897). He then received a master's degree in Arts from Dalhousie University (1901) and his doctorate from University of New Brunswick (1905). While studying at university, he also was rural dean of Halifax (1900-1905). After he achieved his doctorate, Armitage was made Archdeacon of Halifax (1906), and canon of All Saints Cathedral (1907).

He also served as master in divinity at Bishop Ridley College and lecturer on pastoral theology in King's University, Windsor.

Armitage was also acting chaplain of the Queen's Own Rifles, at Niagara Camp on several occasions. He is honorary chaplain of The Princess Louise Fusiliers (66th Regiment), Halifax. During the Boer War, he was acting chaplain to the members of the Church of England in the Canadian contingent while encamped at Halifax. He was promoted to the rank of major (1909) and then lieutenant-colonel (1913).

Honorary chaplain of The Princess Louise Fusiliers (66th Regiment), Halifax.

He was elected president of the Nova Scotia Historical Society in 1911.

== Publications ==
- William Armitage. The Fruit of the Spirit. London: Simpson and Co.1907.
- William Armitage. The Story of the Canadian Revision of the Prayer Book. 1922.
- "The Cities of Refuge"
- "The Church Year" 1908, copies of which were graciously accepted by Queen Mary,
- William Armitage. The soldiers of the King: their warfare, weapons and victory. 1909, a copy of which was accepted by King George the Fifth,
- a number of articles advocating a broader church union of Canada, in 1906.

== Family ==
He is a son of the late William Bond Head Armitage and Jane (Adams) Armitage, and his birth occurred at Bryanston, Ontario, February 6, 1860. Archdeacon Armitage was married in June, 1886, to Elinor Maria Ramsay, elder daughter of the late Robert Ramsay, M. D., of Orilla, Ontario.

His wife was vice-president of the Local Council of Women of Halifax.

== Legacy ==
- Armitage is commemorated by the Narthex-Nave Doorway, St Paul's Anglican Church, which is surrounded by flags of his military unit, the 66 Regiment
