= Povolný =

Povolný (feminine: Povolná) is a Czech surname, meaning 'compliant'. Notable people with the surname include:

- César Povolny (1914–?), French footballer
- Mojmír Povolný (1921–2012), Czech lawyer and politician

== See also ==
- 37141 Povolný, minor planet named after the Czech biologist Dalibor Povolný
- Powolny
