= Storey (disambiguation) =

A storey is a level in a building.

Storey may also refer to:

- Storey (surname)
- Storey (automobile), a British car produced 1916–1930
- Storey Publishing, an imprint of the Workman Publishing Company
- Storey's Way, a street in Cambridge, England
- The Storey, a multi-purpose building in Lancaster, England

== See also ==
- Story (disambiguation)
