= Faber & Faber =

British publishing house

- Founded: 1929; 97 years ago
- Founder: Geoffrey Faber
- Country of origin: United Kingdom
- Headquarters location: London, England
- Distribution: HarperCollins (UK); Allen & Unwin (Australia); Publishers Group West (US); Hachette India (India)
- Publication types: Books
- Official website: faber.co.uk

Faber and Faber Limited, commonly known as Faber & Faber or simply Faber, is an independent publishing house in London. Published authors and poets include T. S. Eliot (an early Faber editor and director), W. H. Auden, C. S. Lewis, Margaret Storey, William Golding, Samuel Beckett, Philip Larkin, Sylvia Plath, Ted Hughes, Seamus Heaney, Paul Muldoon, Milan Kundera and Kazuo Ishiguro.

Founded in 1929, in 2006 the company was named the KPMG Publisher of the Year.

Faber and Faber Inc., formerly the American branch of the London company, was sold in 1998 to the Holtzbrinck company Farrar, Straus and Giroux (FSG). Faber and Faber ended the partnership with FSG in 2015 and began distributing its books directly in the United States.

== History ==
Faber and Faber began as a firm in 1929, but originated in the Scientific Press, owned by Sir Maurice and Lady Gwyer. The Scientific Press derived much of its income from the weekly magazine The Nursing Mirror. The Gwyers' desire to expand into trade publishing led them to Geoffrey Faber, a fellow of All Souls College, Oxford; they founded Faber and Gwyer in 1925. After four years, The Nursing Mirror was sold and Geoffrey Faber and the Gwyers agreed to go their separate ways. Faber selected the company name of Faber and Faber, although there was no other Faber involved.

T. S. Eliot, who had been suggested to Faber by Charles Whibley, had left Lloyds Bank in London to join Faber as a literary adviser; in the first season, the firm issued his Poems 1909–1925. In addition, the catalogues from the early years included books by Ezra Pound, Jean Cocteau, Herbert Read, Max Eastman, George Rylands, John Dover Wilson, Geoffrey Keynes, Forrest Reid, Charles Williams, and Vita Sackville-West. In 1928, Faber and Faber published its first commercial success, Memoirs of a Fox-Hunting Man. The book was at first published anonymously; the author's name, Siegfried Sassoon, was added to the title page for the second impression. Over the next six months, it was reprinted eight times.

=== Role in publishing ===
Poetry was originally the most renowned part of the Faber list, with W. H. Auden, Stephen Spender, and Louis MacNeice joining Ezra Pound, Marianne Moore, Wyndham Lewis, John Gould Fletcher, Roy Campbell, James Joyce, David Jones (artist-poet) and Walter de la Mare being published under T. S. Eliot's aegis.

Under Geoffrey Faber's chairmanship, the board in 1929 included Eliot, Richard de la Mare, Charles Stewart, and Frank Vigor Morley. The firm's art director was Berthold Wolpe. Faber published biographies, memoirs, fiction, poetry, political and religious essays, art and architecture monographs, children's books, and an ecology list. It also published Eliot's literary review, The Criterion. Eliot rejected two books by George Orwell, A Scullion's Diary (the original version of Down and Out in Paris and London) and Animal Farm.

During the Second World War, paper shortages resulted in high profits, but much of this profit went to taxation.

Notable postwar Faber writers include William Golding (although the company almost rejected his Lord of the Flies), Lawrence Durrell, Robert Lowell, Ted Hughes, Sylvia Plath, W. S. Graham, Philip Larkin, P. D. James, Seamus Heaney, Tom Stoppard, and John Osborne. The firm increased its investment in contemporary drama, including plays by three Nobel Laureates: Harold Pinter, Samuel Beckett, and T. S. Eliot. Other playwrights subsequently joined Faber, including Alan Ayckbourn, Alan Bennett, Brian Friel, Tony Harrison, David Hare, Frank McGuinness, and Timberlake Wertenbaker.

=== Today ===
Modern writers such as Kazuo Ishiguro, Peter Carey, Orhan Pamuk, and Barbara Kingsolver also joined Faber. In addition, Faber has published the translated work of prominent novelists and poets including Milan Kundera, Thomas Bernhard, Günter Grass, Nikos Kazantzakis, Wisława Szymborska, Mario Vargas Llosa, and Czesław Miłosz. Having published the theatrical works of Samuel Beckett for several years, the company acquired the rights to the remainder of his oeuvre from the publishing house of John Calder in 2007. Faber announced in October 2011 that Jarvis Cocker, lead singer of the band Pulp, would be joining as editor-at-large, an appointment similar to one held by Pete Townshend of The Who in the 1980s.

In 2008, the imprint Faber Finds was set up to make copyrighted out-of-print books reavailable, using print-on-demand technology. Works republished in the imprint have included items from the Mass-Observation archives, and works by John Betjeman, Angus Wilson, A. J. P. Taylor, H. G. Wells, Joyce Cary, Nina Bawden, Jean Genet, P. H. Newby, Louis MacNeice, John Carey, F. R. Leavis, Jacob Bronowski, Jan Morris, and Brian Aldiss. In 2009, Faber Finds began to release e-books.

Faber's American arm was sold in 1998 to Farrar, Straus and Giroux ("FSG"), where it remained as an imprint focused on arts, entertainment, media, and popular culture. In February 2015, Faber announced the end of its partnership with FSG.

In June 2012, to coincide with the Queen's Diamond Jubilee, Faber launched a website – Sixty Years in Sixty Poems. Commissioned for The Space – the new digital arts platform developed by the Arts Council in partnership with the BBC – Sixty Years in Sixty Poems took the poems from Poet Laureate Carol Ann Duffy's anthology, Jubilee Lines, and interpreted them using actors' recordings, sound-based generative design, and archive film footage.

== Faber Academy ==
In 2008, Faber launched Faber Academy, a creative writing business offering courses for aspiring writers. Courses include "Writing a Novel", "Advanced Poetry", and "Getting Started: Beginners' Fiction". At times, courses are tutored by famous writers, such as Mike Figgis, Jeanette Winterson, and Tobias Hill. Notable students have included S. J. Watson and Georgian/British singer-songwriter Katie Melua.

In 2018, The Faber Academy started offering a scholarship to two writers every year, with a focus on under-represented groups such as writers of colour, disabled writers and LGBTQ+ writers.

== Faber Digital ==
Faber Digital was launched in 2009. It has published a number of book-related apps for the iPhone and the iPad, including Malcolm Tucker: The Missing Phone (which was nominated for a BAFTA award), QI: Quite Interesting, Harry Hill's Joke Book, and The Waste Land for iPad app. The Waste Land for iPad app was Faber's second collaboration with Touch Press, following the Solar System for iPad, which won the Futurebook Award for Digital innovation at the Book Industry Awards in 2011. In 2013, in partnership with Bloomsbury Publishing plc, Faber Digital launched Drama Online, a subscription-based digital content platform for libraries, educators, students, and researchers.

== Faber Factory ==
Faber introduced Faber Factory in 2011, an eBook conversion and digitisation service. Faber Factory won the Services to Independent Publishers Award at the IPG Awards in 2013 and 2015.

== Location ==
The firm's original location was its Georgian offices at 24 Russell Square, in Bloomsbury, London. Faber later moved to 3 Queen Square, London, and on 19 January 2009 the firm moved to Bloomsbury House, 74–77 Great Russell Street, London. The company relocated to The Bindery, Hatton Garden, London in 2023.

== Nobel Laureate authors published by Faber ==
- 1948: T. S. Eliot
- 1960: Saint-John Perse
- 1969: Samuel Beckett
- 1980: Czesław Miłosz
- 1983: William Golding
- 1992: Derek Walcott
- 1995: Seamus Heaney
- 1996: Wisława Szymborska
- 1999: Günter Grass
- 2005: Harold Pinter
- 2006: Orhan Pamuk
- 2010: Mario Vargas Llosa
- 2017: Kazuo Ishiguro

== See also ==
- List of largest UK book publishers
