= Sandford Dugout =

Historic house in Nebraska, United States

- U.S. National Register of Historic Places
- Nearest city: Mitchell, Nebraska
- Area: less than one acre
- Built: 1897
- Built by: Sandford, Joseph L.
- Architectural style: Prairie Folk
- NRHP reference No.: 00000166
- Added to NRHP: March 9, 2000

The Sandford Dugout is a dugout house in Sioux County, Nebraska. The house is located 2 miles (3.2 km) west of Nebraska Highway 29 and approximately 25 miles (40 km) north of Mitchell; its exact location is restricted. Pioneer Joseph L. Sandford built the house in 1897 on a homestead claim. His dugout, like most pioneer dugouts, was carved into the side of a hill. Settlers in the Great Plains commonly built dugout houses or sod homes at the time, as more conventional building materials were difficult to obtain in the region. However, the dugouts were usually considered temporary homes and ultimately abandoned; as a result, most of them fell into disrepair, and the Sandford Dugout is likely the only intact dugout remaining in Nebraska. The Sandford property also contained a house, a barn, a well, a privy, and two corrals; these structures have largely been replaced or demolished, and the location of the well and privy are unknown.

The dugout was added to the National Register of Historic Places on March 9, 2000.
