= Addison Road (album) =

Studio album by Addison Road
- Released: March 18, 2008
- Genre: Christian rock, pop
- Length: 39:31
- Label: INO
- Producer: Christopher Stevens

Addison Road chronology
Some Kind of Spark (2006)	Addison Road (2008)	Stories (2010)

Addison Road is the first album by Christian rock band Addison Road. It was released on March 18, 2008, and entered the Billboard 200 at #182. Three singles have been released off the album — "All That Matters", "Sticking with You" and "Hope Now". The first two singles were the 9th and 15th most-played songs on R&R magazine's Contemporary Christian Music chart for 2008.

== Music and lyrics ==
The band's musical style on Addison Road has been classified by many reviewers as a female-fronted mix of pop and alternative rock. The first single, "All That Matters", has a driving, anthemic rock sound backed by a pop beat, drawing comparisons with Maroon 5. "Sticking with You" has been described as synth-based with a pop/rock "dance-a-long feel". The album's first track, the mid-tempo "This Could Be Our Day", has been compared to Leeland for being an "upbeat tune". The record slows down in the last track with the ballad "What Do I Know of Holy", which Jesus Freak Hideout labeled as lyrically "bringing out a deeper side of the band that was previously unheard earlier on the debut".

== Release ==
In November 2007, Addison Road was originally scheduled to be released in the week of February 26, 2008. It reached #182 on the Billboard 200 within its first few weeks of release on March 18, 2008.

The album's first single, "All That Matters", was released early in January 2008, and quickly generated big success on Christian radio charts. It had reached the top ten on R&R's Christian chart by early February 2008, only five weeks later. For the week of February 12–19, the song was available as a free Discovery Download on iTunes and was downloaded over 165,000 times. "All That Matters" was given an exclusive stream on Napster's website for the week of March 10, 2008, and was featured on a handpicked Addison Road playlist of the band's favorite songs; this was unprecedented for a debut Christian music act. It was the ninth most-played song on R&R magazine's Christian chart for 2008.

The second single from the album, "Sticking with You", was released in mid-2008 and reached number two on R&R's Christian chart on October 17, 2008. The third hit single from the album, "Hope Now", was the theme song for the movie Letters to God. It ended 2008 as the fifteenth most-played song for the year on R&R magazine's Christian chart.

== Critical reception ==
Professional ratings
Review scores
Source	Rating
Allmusic	4/5 stars
CCM	3/5 stars
Christian Music Review	91%
Christianity Today	2/5 stars
Cross Rhythms	8/10 stars
Jesus Freak Hideout	3/5 stars
New Release Tuesday	3.5/5 stars 4.5/5 stars
Soul Shine	4.5/5 stars

Addison Road received generally positive reception from music critics. Stephen Thomas Erlewine of Allmusic gave it four stars writing that "At times, the group musters up enough energy and hooks to have a passing resemblance to Avril Lavigne, but this is hardly trash punk-pop: it's big music even at its quietest moments, and what's endearing about the group is that their utter sincerity is matched by a natural melodicism and sturdy songwriting, qualities that are easy to appreciate regardless of religious denomination." At New Release Tuesday, Sarah Fine gave it four-and-a-half stars praising the "Fresh beats and the consistent message of hope running through the album are sure to leave any listener satisfied." Kevin Davis also of New Release Tuesday rated it three-and-a-half stars noting that "Jenny Simmons has a nice voice and this is a promising debut album." At Cross Rhythms, Julie Porter rated it eight out of ten noting "the finely crafted songwriting, tight musicianship and the beautiful, distinctive vocals of Jenny Simmons leave you wanting to have this album on repeat so you can capture every last drop!" Liz Zelinski of Christian Music Review gave it a score of 91 percent, writing that "Addison Road has created an eclectic project, with wide-ranging rhythm that is entertaining and thoughtful." At Soul Shine magazine, Lindsay Whitfield rated it four-and-a-half stars calling it "a seriously insightful and musically brilliant recording".

At CCM magazine, Lizza Connor Bowen gave it three stars stating that the music uses too many rote metaphors and calling the lyrics simplistically direct in the "upbeat anthems of exhortation and encouragement." Garrett DeRossett of Jesus Freak Hideout gave it three stars commenting that the band had "produced a fine debut", but only "If they had attempted to step outside the box just a bit more, it would've made a world of difference." At Christianity Today, Christa Banister rated it two stars cautioning that "Addison Road plays it much too safe to really make much of a memorable impact. Instead of embracing the scrappy and creative underdog spirit of a band who's fought so hard to make it, Addison Road takes the well-traveled road, making their debut just another so-so effort with a positive message. They're capable of much more than this."

== Track listing ==
No.	Title	Writer(s)	Length
1.	"This Could Be Our Day"	Ryan Gregg, Rob Hawkins, Travis Lawrence, Jenny Simmons, Ryan Simmons, Jeff Sutton	3:51
2.	"All That Matters"	Gregg, Sam Mizell, J. Simmons, Chris Stevens	3:27
3.	"Sticking with You"	Gregg, Aaron Rice, J. Simmons, Stevens	3:27
4.	"Hope Now"	Gregg	3:44
5.	"Start Over Again"	Gregg, Stevens	5:34
6.	"It Just Takes One"	Gregg, Lawrence, J. Simmons, R. Simmons, Sutton, Stevens	3:37
7.	"Always Love"	Matthew Caws, Ira Elliot, Daniel Lorca	3:27
8.	"Casualties"	Gregg, Lawrence, J. Simmons, R. Simmons, Sutton, Stevens	3:38
9.	"Run"	Lawrence, J. Simmons, Clint Lagerberg	4:11
10.	"What Do I Know of Holy"	J. Simmons, Alli Rogers	4:35
Total length:			39:31

== Personnel ==
Adapted from AllMusic.

- Jenny Simmons – lead vocals
- Ryan Gregg – guitar, vocals
- Ryan Simmons – guitar, keyboard, backing vocals
- Travis Lawrence – bass guitar, backing vocals, cover design
- Jeff Sutton – drums, percussion
- Christopher Stevens – producer, mixing
- Kevin Powell – assistant engineer
- Chris Stevens – keyboard, programming
- Hannah Schroeder – cello
- Justin York – guitar
- Tec Petaja – photography
- Emily Thomas – wardrobe
- Dana Salsedo – wardrobe
- Megan Thompson – make-up, hair stylist

== Charts ==
Chart (2008)	Peak position
US Billboard 200	182
US Christian Albums (Billboard)	11
US Heatseekers Albums (Billboard)	8
