= Addison Road (band) =

American Christian pop/rock band

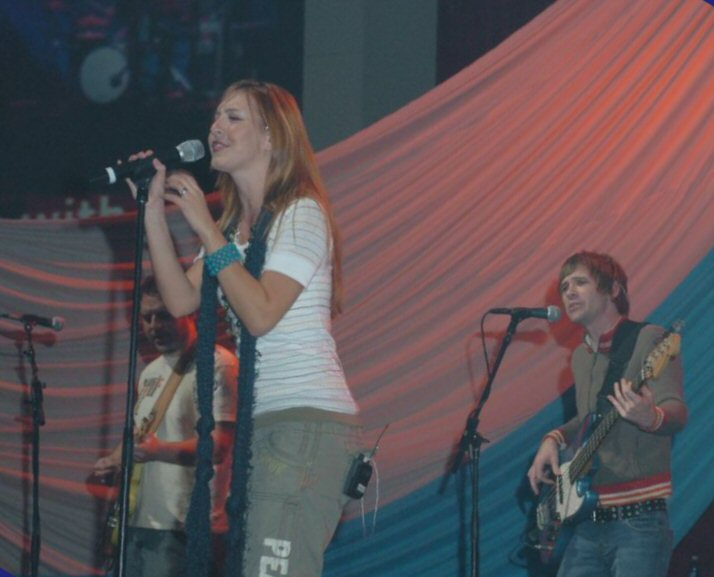
- Addison Road in 2006

Background information
- Origin: Dallas, Texas
- Genres: Christian rock, contemporary Christian music, alternative rock, rock music
- Years active: 2002–2012
- Label: INO
- Past members: Jenny Simmons; Ryan Gregg; Ryan Simmons; Travis Lawrence; Josh Anzaldua; Jeff Sutton
- Website: www.addisonroad.com

Addison Road was a Christian alternative pop/rock band from Dallas, Texas. The band was signed to INO Records in 2007 and released its self-titled debut album, Addison Road, on March 18, 2008. Its songs "All That Matters" and "Sticking With You" were the ninth and fifteenth most-played songs on R&R magazine's Christian CHR chart for 2008. On August 1, 2012, the band announced that after 10 years it would complete its time as a band.

== History ==
=== Formation ===
Jenny Chisolm (vocalist) met Ryan Simmons (guitarist) at Baylor University in Waco, Texas, and they began writing songs together not long after the group started booking a few gigs. When it became apparent that they needed a full band, they recruited friends Jay Henderson to play the drums, and Ryan Gregg (then a member of another band called Tribe America) to play lead guitar. They recorded a rough four-song demo under the name "Jenny Chisolm Band."

By January 2001, the band had acquired producer Chuck Dennie from By the Tree, and had recorded their first full-length independent album called Not What You Think. After that point they recruited another friend, bassist Travis Lawrence. In 2002, Ryan and Jenny were married, and moved to Dallas to work as full-time musicians. The band later changed its name to "Addison Road," after their sound technician's daughter named Addison.

Later that year they came out with a second indie album called Breaking Beautifully. After getting a new drummer and beginning to lead worship at Richardson First Baptist Church, the band played in front of about 8,000 young people in the summer. That performance inspired its next indie project, Always Loved You EP, which was released in June 2005. They released their final independent album titled Some Kind of Spark. in July 2006.

In the spring of 2009 the band toured with the Rock and Worship Road Show, along with Jeremy Camp, MercyMe, Hawk Nelson, and Tenth Avenue North. However, because Jenny Simmons was pregnant with her first child, the group performed one song per show. On April 15, 2009, Jenny gave birth to the healthy baby girl, Anniston Cate, in the band's hometown of Dallas, Texas.

Drummer Jeff Sutton left in January 2010 to concentrate on finishing a college degree he had begun earlier in life. The remaining band members searched for their new drummer via YouTube.

In July 2012 lead singer Jenny announced that the band was more or less inactive, and confirmed on August 1, 2012, via the official website that members had "...collectively decided to put a definite end to Addison Road." On the same day, the band posted a goodbye video on Youtube.

=== Addison Road ===
After being an independent band for six years, Addison Road signed onto INO Records in August 2007. Their self-titled debut album, Addison Road, was released on March 18, 2008, and debuted at No. 182 on the Billboard 200.

=== Stories ===
Their final album Stories was released on June 22, 2010.

== Band members ==
Final lineup

- Jenny Simmons – lead vocals
- Ryan Gregg – lead guitarist, vocals
- Ryan Simmons – guitar, vocals, piano
- Travis Lawrence – bass guitar, vocals, harmonica
- Richard Scott – drums

Former

- Josh Anzaldua – drums (2003–2005)
- Jeff Sutton – drums (2005–2010)

== Discography ==
=== Studio albums ===
- Not What You Think (independent) (2001)
- Breaking Beautifully (independent) (September 2003)
- Some Kind of Spark (independent) (July 2006)
- Addison Road – (March 18, 2008) – Label: INO Records
- Stories – (June 22, 2010) – Label: INO Records

=== EPs ===
- Always Loved You EP (Inthecitymusic) (June 2005)

=== Singles ===
- "All That Matters" – No. 1 on the March 28, 2008, R&R Christian CHR chart and ninth most played song on R&R's 2008 year end chart
- "Sticking with You" – No. 2 on R&R's Christian CHR chart for the week of October 17, 2008, and the fifteenth most-played song on R&R's 2008 year end chart
- "Hope Now"
- "What Do I Know of Holy"
- "Fight Another Day"
- "This Little Light of Mine"
- "Don't Wait"
- "Won't Let Me Go" (November 15; 2011 - Official CHR Servicing Date)

== Awards ==
In 2009, Addison Road was nominated for a Dove Award for New Artist of the Year at the 40th GMA Dove Awards.
