= The Becoming =

The Becoming may refer to:

- The Becoming (EP), an EP by After Midnight Project
- The Becoming (album), a 2013 album by Jenny Simmons
- The Becoming (Grey's Anatomy), an episode of Grey's Anatomy
- "The Becoming", a song from the Nine Inch Nails album The Downward Spiral
