= Glen, Nebraska =

Unincorporated community in Sioux County, Nebraska

Coordinates: 42°36′27″N 103°35′02″W

Glen is an unincorporated community in Sioux County, Nebraska, United States. It was named for the surrounding glen.

== History ==
A post office was established at Glen in 1887, and remained in operation until 1953. There are still a few residents.
