= Andrews, Nebraska =

Unincorporated community in Nebraska, United States

- Unincorporated Community
- Location within Nebraska Location within the United States
- Coordinates: 42°37′53″N 103°55′02″W
- Country: United States
- State: Nebraska
- County: Sioux

Andrews is an unincorporated community in Sioux County, Nebraska, United States.

== History ==
A post office was established at Andrews in 1906, and remained in operation until it was discontinued in 1951. Sources on the etymology of the name differ. It was either named for J. W. Andrews, a railroad engineer, or for a pioneer settler.
