= Powolny =

Powolny is a surname. It means 'slow' in Polish, but it is also a Germanized form of the Czech surname Povolný. Notable people with the surname include:

- Anton Powolny (1899–?), Austrian footballer
- Michael Powolny (1871–1954), Austrian artist
- Siegfried Powolny (1915–1944), Austrian handball player
