= Orella, Nebraska =

Former town in Nebraska, U.S.

Coordinates: 42°53′36″N 103°30′02″W

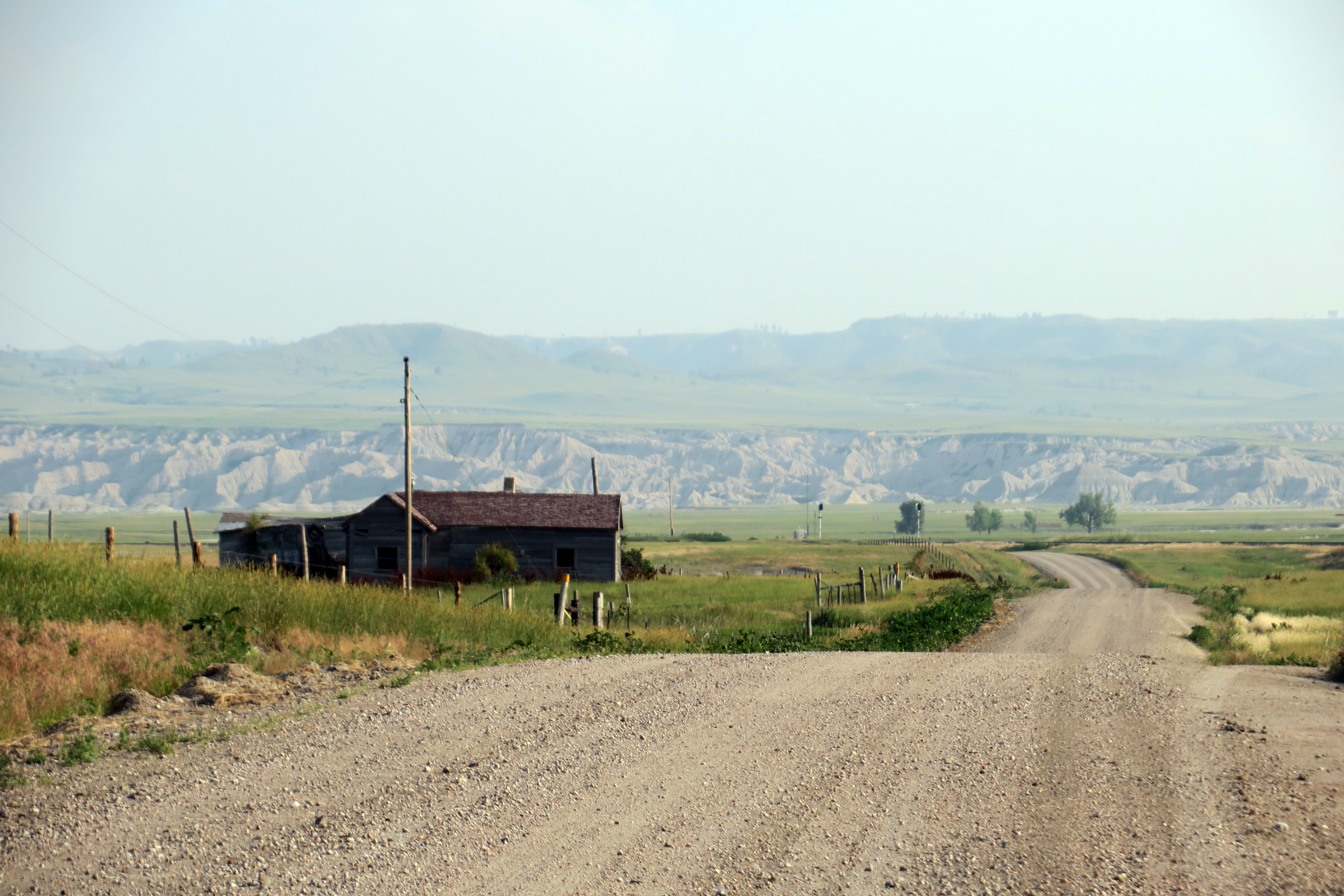
Orella, Nebraska

Orella was formerly a town in Sioux County, Nebraska, United States, along the BNSF Railway Butte Subdivision. It was settled by immigrants in the mid-1880s and established as a town by the railroad in 1906. Orella was last inhabited in the 1960s, and its former site is now private property.

== History ==
The area was first settled in the mid-1880s with the arrival of the Rosenberg and Wasserberger families. They established homesteads and ranching operations as a means of income along Cottonwood Creek and named the settlement Adelia. In 1889, the railroad crested Crawford Hill and entered the area and established a water station and telegraph office in Adelia. However, the grade westbound was steep from the stop in Adelia, and in spring 1906, the Chicago, Burlington, and Quincy Railroad moved the water station and telegraph office from Adelia, several miles to the north higher on the grade. Adelia would be renamed Joder, and the new railroad office location became known as Orella, named in honor of a local woman.

With land patents being granted by the U.S. Government, and its importance to the railroad, Orella would become a thriving town. There were multiple streets with a typical suburban block and lot plan. There were multiple goods stores, a stable, and a church. A post office was established in 1910 and remained in operation until being discontinued in 1957, along with railroad passenger service to the town. Orella served as a railhead for local ranchers to ship cattle, and once had a small railyard. The town would also become home to the railroad track gang until 1960, when their base was moved to the south in Crawford.

Orella's population began to decline with the depression in the 1930s. After World War II, the economic boom allowed many to leave rural Orella for population centers. The final blows came as the U.S. Army began scaling back employment and operations at the Black Hills Ordnance Depot in the 1950s.

The last permanent residents of Orella were John and Mable Carnahan, who lived in a home they built on the east side of the tracks in 1923. John worked for the railroad on the track gang, while Mable worked in a store and eventually became postmistress. In 1968, they left Orella and moved to Edgemont, South Dakota, due to John's health, and would never return. The town would officially disappear from the railroad rule books and employee timetables in 1992.

As of June 2016, the only remaining structures are the Carnahan house, railroad section foreman's house, and train station. The section foreman's house and station have been moved away from the tracks into a private corral. All of the structures are located on private property, and are not for public visitation. Trespassers will be prosecuted.
