= Stories (Addison Road album) =

Studio album by Addison Road
- Released: June 22, 2010
- Genre: Christian rock, pop
- Length: 34:10
- Label: INO
- Producer: Christopher Stevens

Addison Road chronology
Addison Road (2008)	Stories (2010)

Stories is the second album from Christian rock band Addison Road. It was released on June 22, 2010, under INO Records. A music video for "This Little Light of Mine" was released by Addison Road on GodTube.com (formerly tangle.com). The album received positive reception and commercial success.

== Background ==
The album was released on June 22, 2010, by INO Records, and it was produced by Christopher Stevens. This was the second and last studio album for Addison Road.

== Critical reception ==
Professional ratings
Review scores
Source	Rating
Allmusic	4.5/5 stars
CCM Magazine	4/5 stars
Christian Broadcasting Network	3/5 spins
The Christian Manifesto	4.25/5
Christian Music Review	97%
Christianity Today	3/5 stars
Cross Rhythms	10/10 stars
Indie Vision Music	4/5 stars
Jesus Freak Hideout	3/5 stars 4/5 stars
New Release Tuesday	4/5 stars

Stories garnered generally positive reception from music critics. At CCM Magazine, Matt Conner gave it four stars calling it a "confident, moving mix". Sarah Fine of New Release Tuesday rated it four stars noting that this is the "FARTHEST thing from a slump". At Indie Vision Music, Steve gave it four stars affirming the album to be "excellent". Samantha Schaumberg of Jesus Freak Hideout gave it four stars feeling that the band "brings out a well-rounded sophomore release, with a much more distinguished, original sound." At The Christian Manifesto, Lydia Akinola gave it four and a fourth of a star stating that the band "has done itself proud." Jared Johnson of Allmusic gave it four-and-a-half stars commenting on how "the upbeat collection connects with sparkling hooks" are "appealing to both faith-based and secular listeners on an emotional level." At Christian Music Review, Kevin Davis gave it a 97-percent proclaiming this to be an "excellent album" containing many "musical hooks" and "Jenny's vulnerable and sincere vocals and the extremely poignant lyrics." Simon Eden of Cross Rhythms gave it a perfect ten writing that it is "a finely crafted album that builds on the band's previous self-titled album."

However, Andrew Greer of Christianity Today gave it three stars criticizing that "the lyrics are middle-of-the-road" material, however believing that the band "possesses enough musical range, including Jenny Simmons' formidable vocals, to distinguish themselves from the rest of the pop/rock crowd." At Christian Broadcasting Network, Jennifer E. Jones gave it three out of five noting that "This album isn’t ground-breaking, but for what it's worth, you'll find a song or two that will make you smile." Nathaniel Schexnayder gave it three stars writing that it was and improvement over their first offering calling it "more seasoned" but believing that it is easy to "notice the group’s contemporary slide, and write off the album as an unoriginal, unchallenging pop project." In addition, Schexnayder stating that "In truth though, Stories is a release that is easy to listen to and just a little bit too easy to forget", and this is why the album was "for those who are seeking a fun, but simple, encouraging, pop/rock album."

== Commercial performance ==
For the Billboard charting week of July 10, 2010, Stories was the No. 4 most sold album on the breaking-and-entry chart the Heatseekers Albums chart, and it was the No. 13 most sold on the Christian Albums chart for the Christian market.

== Track listing ==
No.	Title	Writer(s)	Length
1.	"Fight Another Day"	Cary Barlowe, Toby McKeehan, Jamie Moore	3:18
2.	"Change in the Making"	Jeff Pardo, Alli Rogers, Jenny Simmons	3:34
3.	"This Little Light of Mine"	Ryan Gregg	3:48
4.	"Won't Let Me Go"	Adam Agee, Luke Caldwell, Nick DePartee, Jon Howard, Addison Road, Chris Stevens, Jeff Sutton	3:01
5.	"Need You Now"	Gregg	4:14
6.	"Show Me Life"	Gregg, Sam Mizell	3:22
7.	"Don't Wait"	Jeremy Bose, Gregg, Travis Lawrence, Simmons	3:11
8.	"Where It All Begins"	Addison Road, Stevens, Sutton	2:59
9.	"Who I Am in You"	Gregg, Doug McKelvey	3:12
10.	"My Story"	Simmons, Stevens	3:31
Total length:			34:10

== Charts ==
Chart (2010)	Peak position
US Christian Albums (Billboard)	13
US Heatseekers Albums (Billboard)	4
