= Wind Springs Ranch =

- Wind Springs Ranch Historic and Archeological District
- U.S. National Register of Historic Places
- U.S. Historic district
- Location within Nebraska Location within the United States
- Nearest city: Scottsbluff, Nebraska
- Coordinates: 42°04′33″N 103°39′53″W
- Area: 3,626 acres (1,467 ha)
- NRHP reference No.: 00001403
- Added to NRHP: November 22, 2000

Wind Springs Ranch is a historic ranch complex located in the Wind Springs Creek Valley in Sioux County, Nebraska. The present ranch, which was built around 1910, was the third European settlement constructed on the property. The ranch has mainly raised cattle and sheep. Settlers constructed two homesteads on the property in the 19th century, neither of which lasted long; the two homesteads only survive as archaeological remains. In addition, the Fort Laramie to Spotted Tail Agency Road ran across the property in the 1800s, and Wind Springs was likely a campsite along the road; wagon ruts still remain along the road's path through the ranch. Researchers have determined the existence of eighteen sites related to European settlement on the ranch; aside from the ranch itself, all are archaeological sites.

The ranch is also the site of fifty-four archaeological sites which remain from Native American settlement in the area. A number of Paleoindian artifacts and a multitude of Archaic period projectile points indicate that settlement in the Wind Springs Creek Valley dates back several thousand years. Archaeologists separate the known sites in the area into sites in uplands and on butte tops, valley sites, and rock cairns. Two particularly significant sites, one located atop a butte and one located near its base, have yielded artifacts such as tools and bison bones.

The ranch was added to the National Register of Historic Places on November 22, 2000, under the name Wind Springs Ranch Historic and Archeological District.
