= Joder, Nebraska =

Unincorporated community in Nebraska, United States

Joder
- Unincorporated community
- Location within the state of Nebraska
- Coordinates: 42°52′58″N 103°32′27″W
- Country: United States
- State: Nebraska
- County: Sioux
- Time zone: UTC-6 (Central (CST))
  - Summer (DST): UTC-5 (CDT)
- FIPS code: 24635

Joder is an unincorporated community in Sioux County, Nebraska, United States. Joder is a former siding along a BNSF Railway line.

== History ==
Joder was formerly called Adelia. A post office was established at Adelia in 1891, and remained in operation until it was discontinued in 1910.
