= The Becoming (album) =

Studio album by Jenny Simmons
- Released: February 5, 2013
- Genre: Contemporary Christian music
- Length: 37:37
- Label: Fair Trade
- Producer: Paul Moak

The Becoming is the debut studio album from contemporary Christian musician Jenny Simmons, which was produced by Paul Moak, and released on February 5, 2013 by Fair Trade Services. The album has seen commercial charting successes, as well as positive critical reception from music critics.

== Music and lyrics ==
At Worship Leader, Greg Wallace stated that "Simmons charts an individualistic course, infusing her music with a real sense of what it’s like for her to live her day-to-day life. In fact, much of the lyrical material here looks like it could have been taken directly from her daily journal." Tony Cummings of Cross Rhythms said that "she shows that she is an exceptional vocal talent with a style which one critic suggested was pitched somewhere between Norah Jones and Taylor Swift." At New Release Tuesday, Dawn Teresa wrote that "The writing is solid and the performances commanding. The result is an honest, deeply personal chronicle of her journey marked by a vulnerability and authenticity that is sure to capture listeners' ears and hearts." Jono Davies at Louder Than the Music told that "lyrically she always looks at the positive side of life."

Jonathan Andre at Indie Vision Music told that the album was "With each of Jenny’s songs giving us a great reminder of moving from fear into comfort, worry into assurance and uncertainty into hope; Jenny has delivered an album full of remedies, struggles and encouragements, each with the primary message of running to the Father as we enter seasons of renewal and restoration." At Jesus Freak Hideout, Mark Rice wrote that for "those that are tired of cheery (if not sometimes cheesy) lyrics with glossy production that fits right into the mold of Christian Pop/AC heard oh-so-frequently on the radio, would do well to stay away from The Becoming." The Phantom Tollbooth's Michael Dalton stated that this album "chronicles the difficult journey toward wholeness and freedom", and that "These songs deal with the 'in-between,' where questions play a role in finding truth". Joshua Andre of Christian Music Zine told that this album has "10 honest works of art based on her personal experiences, with plenty of heart and emotion".

== Critical reception ==
Professional ratings
Review scores
Source	Rating
CCM Magazine	4/5 stars
Christian Music Zine	(4.75/5)
Cross Rhythms	7/10 squares
Indie Vision Music	4/5 stars
Jesus Freak Hideout	3/5 stars
Louder Than the Music	4/5 stars
New Release Tuesday	4.5/5 stars
The Phantom Tollbooth	3.5/5 stars
Worship Leader	4/5 stars

The Becoming garnered generally positive reception by music critics to critique the album. At CCM Magazine, Andy Argyrakis told that "The results find the spellbinding singer and authentic songwriter turning in an earthly batch of relatable narratives filled with hope and purpose." Greg Wallace of Worship Leader said that "The end result is simple, honest, and, in its best moments, spiritually refreshing." At Cross Rhythms, Tony Cummings called this "An impressive solo debut". Dawn Teresa of New Release Tuesday affirmed that the album "lacks for nothing." Louder Than the Music's Jono Davies felt that the release "shows so much promise, and is a truly good effort."

At Indie Vision Music, Jonathan Andre felt that the album was "a great listen [...] with Jenny's heartfelt moments of realisation and clarity, it is us that will be changed from listening to one of the most life-changing albums" that he has "listened to since Matthew West's Into The Light", which he told "Well done Jenny for such a great album!" Mark Rice at Jesus Freak Hideout felt that "While her name itself will likely attract many listeners, ultimately The Becoming is, from the cover art to the last notes and everything in between, perfectly average." At Christian Music Zine, Joshua Andre called this album "definitely a no-brainer!"

== Commercial performance ==
For the Billboard charting week of February 23, 2013, The Becoming was the No. 16 most sold album in the breaking and entry chart of the United States by the Top Heatseekers and it was the No. 34 Top Christian Album as well.

== Track listing ==
Track list
No.	Title	Writer(s)	Length
1.	"Where I Belong"	Paul Moak, Jenny Simmons	3:13
2.	"What Faith's About"	Mia Fieldes, Simmons	3:32
3.	"Heaven Waits For Me"	Steve Miller, Simmons	3:40
4.	"This I Know"	Ross King, Simmons	3:13
5.	"Broken Hallelujah"	Don Chaffer, Moak, Simmons	4:23
6.	"The Becoming"	Ellie Holcomb, Alli Rogers, Simmons	4:13
7.	"Letting You Go"	David Hodges, Miller, Moak, Simmons	3:53
8.	"The In Between"	Moak, Simmons	3:15
9.	"Don't Lose Heart"	Moak, Simmons, Jeff Taylor	3:47
10.	"Come Healing"	Leonard Cohen, Patrick Leonard	4:28
Total length:			37:37

== Charts ==
Chart (2013)	Peak position
US Christian Albums (Billboard)	34
US Top Heatseekers Albums (Billboard)	16
