= Thomas Story =

English Quaker speaker and author (1670–1742)

Thomas Story (1670?–1742) was an English Quaker convert and friend of William Penn, whose writings were very influential to Quakers. In 1698, he visited colonial America, lectured to Quakers there, and held positions in the Pennsylvania colony.

== Early life ==
Born around 1670, he was son by his first wife of Thomas Story of Justice Town in the parish of Kirklinton, near Carlisle, and younger brother of George Warter Story. After being educated at the Carlisle grammar school, and acquiring skill in fencing and music, Story read law under Dr. Richard Gilpin at Scaleby Castle, Cumberland. In 1687 he settled in chambers in Carlisle.

== Quaker ==
Story began to have scruples about the christening of infants and other rites. Story experienced on 1 April 1689 a call or ‘conversion’ to Quaker tenets. He at once ‘put off his usual airs, his jovial address, and the sword which he had worn as a modish and manly ornament.’ He also burned his musical instruments, and divested himself of the superfluous parts of his apparel. In 1693 he began to preach. That year he first met William Penn, who, on his deciding to settle in London (1695), assisted him to find legal employment among the Quakers, in conveyancing and drawing up settlements. He was appointed registrar of the Society of Friends, and employed to abstract and index the deeds of London quarterly meeting. At this time he paid visits to, and discussed Quakerism with, the Countess of Carlisle, Sir John Rhodes of Balbur Hall, Derbyshire; Sir Thomas Liddell of Ravensworth Castle, Northumberland; and the Tsar Peter the Great, then on a visit to Greenwich, whom he presented the Latin version of Robert Barclay's Apology. Story accompanied Penn to Ireland in 1698, stayed at Shangarry, and visited his brother, George Story, then Dean of Limerick.

== In America ==
In November 1698 Story sailed for Pennsylvania, where, at the request of Penn, who shortly followed, he remained sixteen years. He was chosen the first recorder of Philadelphia by a charter of 25 October 1701, was a member of the council of state, keeper of the great seal, master of the rolls, and in 1706 elected mayor of Philadelphia, but paid a fine of £20 for declining to serve.

Story was also treasurer of the Pennsylvania Land Company, to which, about the time he left, he sold his estates. James Hoskins, in the ‘Pennsylvania Bubble bubbled by the Treasurer,’ 1726, accused him of unfair dealings, but Story was adjudged honest by a court of arbitration appointed in London in 1723. During his residence in Pennsylvania, Story travelled about preaching, and visited Jamaica and Barbados. He married while in America, but lost his wife six years later.

== Later life ==
On 6 December 1714 Story returned to London, and on Sunday, 12 December, he preached at Gracechurch Street meeting. He held meetings at Oxford, which were attended by ‘scholars and people of fashion;’ the former created an unruly disturbance.

On a visit to Holland in 1715 William Sewel acted as his interpreter. Next year he was preaching in Ireland. At Limerick crowds came to see the dean's brother; while his cousin, Charles Story, prebendary of Limerick, also attended his meetings. At Kilkenny Story was arrested, but after a few days the sheriff released him, in spite of the bishop of Ossory having committed him for three months' imprisonment.

In 1717 Story was with the Barclays at Ury in Scotland. The next year he attended the deathbed and funeral of William Penn. From this time he paid during the season frequent visits to Bath, where his preaching was so admired that the afternoon meetings were crowded. When he was at Justice Town, which he purchased from his brother's widow about 1723, his favourite pursuit was forestry. He planted nurseries of many English and American trees, and at the time of his death, from paralysis, on 24 June 1742, was building a new house.

He was buried in the Friends' burial-ground at Fisher Street, Carlisle, on 26 June. By his wife Anne, daughter of Edward Shippen, first mayor of Philadelphia in 1701, Story had no issue. He devised by his will, dated 1741, all his lands in England and Pennsylvania to be sold, the former for the benefit of his sister, Ann Elliot, and her two daughters; the latter for members of the Shippen family. Money was left to poor Friends of Carlisle monthly meeting, and for the education of Quaker children in Clerkenwell.

== Works ==
Story's sermons were taken down in shorthand and some were collected as ‘Discourses delivered in the Public Assemblies of the People called Quakers,’ 1738, 1744, 1764. Beside several papers, he published:

- ‘Reasons why those of the … Quakers challenged by George Keith to meet him … refuse,’ 1696.
- ‘A Word to the Wise,’ also in answer to Keith, 1697; republished as ‘A Word to the Well Inclin'd,’ 1698.

His ‘Journal,’ Newcastle, 1747, contains the account of his missionary labours, and of interviews with persons of rank. It was abridged by John Kendall (1726–1815), 1786, 1832, and published in the ‘Friends' Library,’ Philadelphia, 1846. Story relates a discussion with the Earl of Lonsdale in 1739 on early Methodists.
