= Sioux County Courthouse (Nebraska) =

- U.S. National Register of Historic Places
- U.S. Historic district
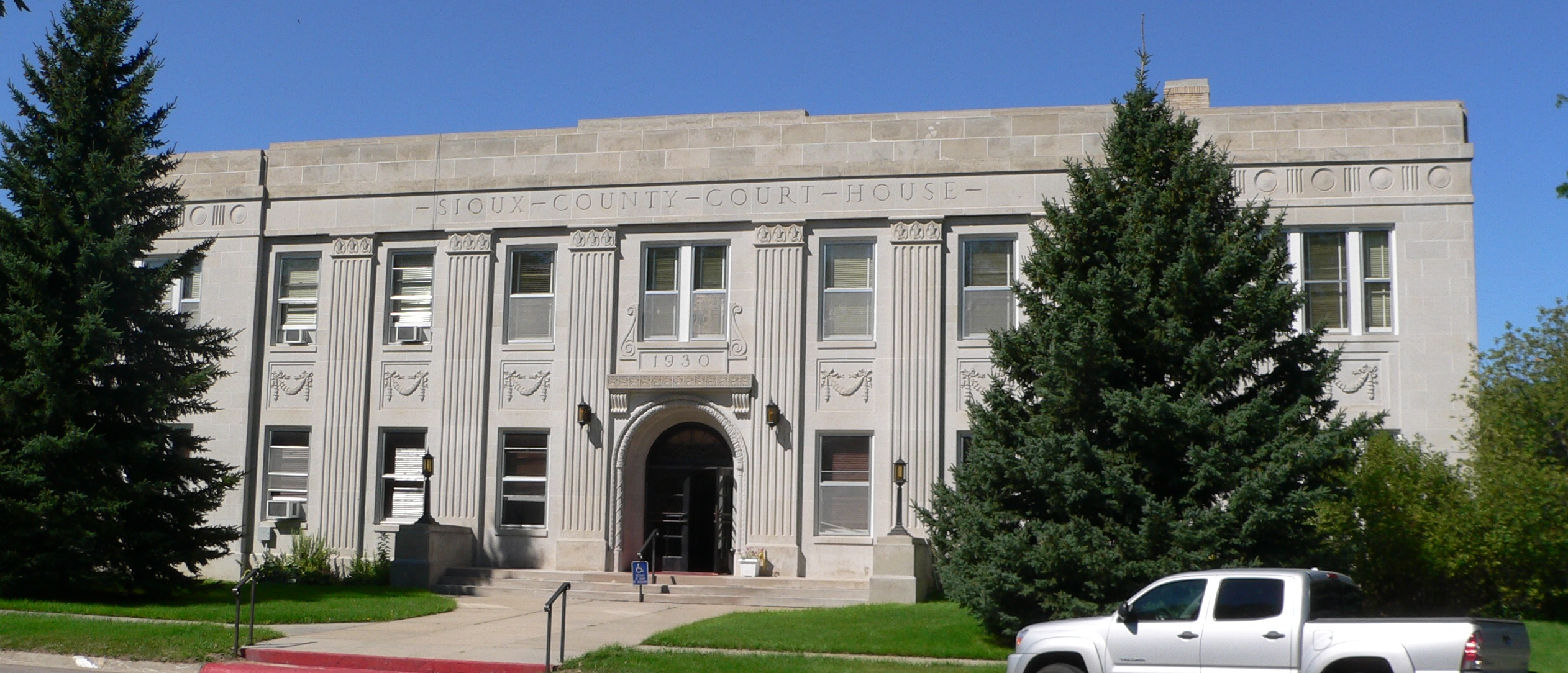
- East side of Sioux County Courthouse

- Location within Nebraska Location within the United States
- Location: NE corner of Main and 3rd Sts., Harrison, Nebraska
- Coordinates: 42.68895°N 103.88340°W
- Built: 1930
- Architect: Goldsmith, E.L.
- Architectural style: Classical Revival
- MPS: County Courthouses of Nebraska MPS
- NRHP reference No.: 90000963
- Added to NRHP: July 05, 1990

The Sioux County Courthouse, located at the northeast corner of Main and 3rd Streets in Harrison, is the center of government of Sioux County, Nebraska. The courthouse was built in 1930 to replace the county's first courthouse, an 1888 building that had fallen into poor condition. Architect E.L. Goldsmith of Scottsbluff designed the courthouse in the County Citadel style, a Classical Revival-influenced design used in six Nebraska courthouses. The courthouse's design features six fluted pilasters on the front facade and a central entrance with a round arch. The front side of the building also includes a lintel above the doorway, moldings with decorative capitals around the entrance, and a cornice with the inscription "Sioux County Court House".

The courthouse was listed on the National Register of Historic Places in 1990.
