= Jock Smeaton =

Scottish footballer

Personal information
- Full name: John Raymond Smeaton
- Date of birth: 29 July 1914
- Place of birth: Perth, Scotland
- Date of death: February 1984 (aged 69)
- Place of death: Perth, Scotland
- Height: 5 ft 8 in (1.73 m)
- Position: Inside forward

Senior career*
Years	Team	Apps	(Gls)
1933–1934	Scone Thistle		
1934–1936	St Johnstone	8	(1)
1936–1938	Blackburn Rovers	38	(9)
1938–1939	Sunderland	28	(4)
1945–1946	Jeanfield Swifts		
1946	Albion Rovers		
1946–1947	East Fife	6	(2)
1947–1951	St Johnstone	58	(15)
- * Club domestic league appearances and goals

John Raymond Smeaton (29 July 1914 – February 1984) was a Scottish professional footballer who played as an inside forward for Sunderland.
