= Wallace L. Storey =

American politician (1928–2007)

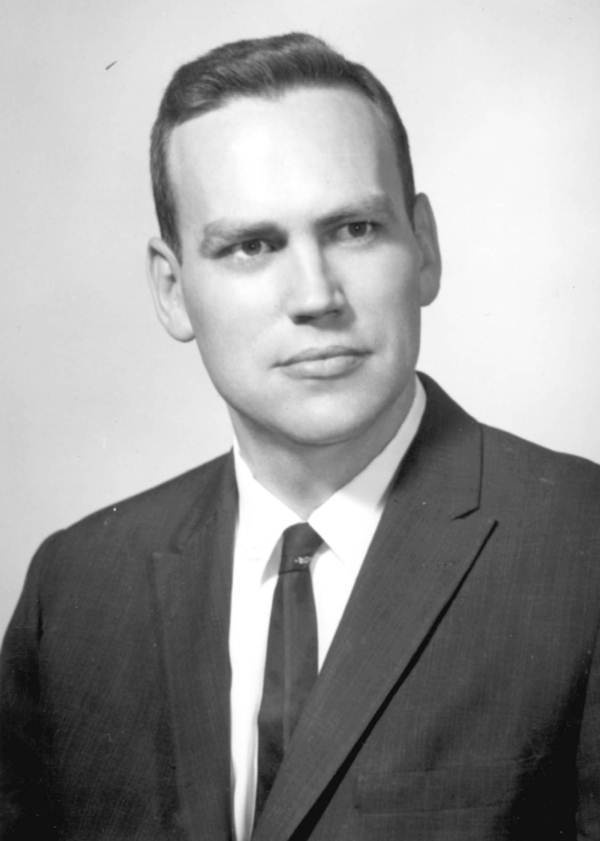
- Storey in 1965

Member of the Florida House of Representatives from Polk County
- In office 1965–1967

Personal details
- Born: February 14, 1928
- Died: October 14, 2007 (aged 79)
- Party: Democratic
- Education: Florida Southern College; Stetson University College of Law

Wallace L. Storey (February 14, 1928 – October 14, 2007) was an American politician. He served as a Democratic member of the Florida House of Representatives.

== Life and career ==
Storey attended Florida Southern College and Stetson University College of Law.

In 1965, Storey was elected to the Florida House of Representatives, serving until 1967.

Storey died in October 2007, at the age of 79.
