= Becoming =

Becoming may refer to:

== Philosophy and religion ==
- Becoming (philosophy), the dynamic aspect of being, in philosophical ontology
- Bhava, or Becoming, a concept in Hinduism and Buddhism

== Arts and entertainment ==
=== Books ===
- Becoming (book), a 2018 autobiography by Michelle Obama
- Becoming: Basic Considerations for a Psychology of Personality, a 1955 book by Gordon Allport

=== Film and television ===
- Becoming (2020 documentary film), an American film based on Michelle Obama's book
- Becoming (2020 horror film), an American film by Omar Naim
- Becoming (2002 TV series), a 2002–2004 reality series produced by MTV
- Becoming (2020 TV series), a 2020 docuseries produced by Walt Disney Television
- "Becoming" (The 4400), a 2004 TV episode
- "Becoming" (Buffy the Vampire Slayer), a 1998 TV episode

=== Music ===
- Becoming (Abigail Williams album), 2012
- Becoming (Ari Koivunen album), 2008
- Becoming (Sarah Geronimo album), 2006
- Becoming (Stacy Barthe album), 2015
- Becoming (Yolanda Adams album), 2011
- Becoming, an album by Christine Denté of Out of the Grey, 2003
- Becoming, a 2013 EP and 2015 album by Courage My Love
- Becoming, an album by Kenichi Suzumura, 2009
- "Becoming" (song), by Pantera, 1994
- "Becoming", a song by Jewel from 0304, 2003
