= Jenny Simmons =

American singer (born 1980)

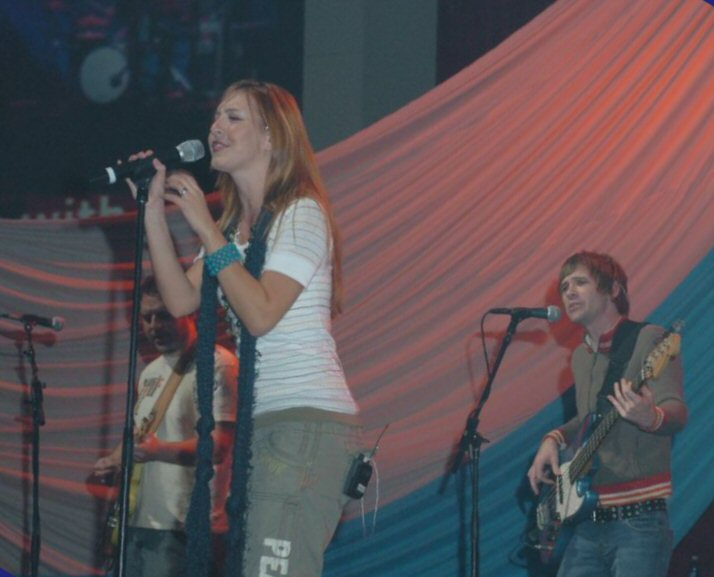
- Simmons (left) performing with Addison Road in 2006

Background information
- Born: Jennifer Ann Chisolm; November 17, 1980 (age 45); Albuquerque, New Mexico
- Origin: U.S.
- Genres: Pop, CCM, Christian AC
- Occupations: Singer, songwriter
- Instrument: Vocals
- Years active: 2002–present
- Formerly of: Addison Road
- Website: www.jennysimmons.com

Jennifer Ann Simmons (born November 17, 1980, née, Chisolm), known professionally as Jenny Simmons, is an American Christian music artist, formerly of the band Addison Road.

== Early life ==
Simmons was born in Albuquerque, New Mexico on November 17, 1980, to missionary parents, Steve and Debbie Chisolm. Her youth included moving between New Mexico, Florida, Mississippi and Texas.

== Discography ==
=== Studio albums ===
List of studio albums, with selected chart positions
Title	Album details	Peak chart positions	
Title	Album details	US Christ	US Heat
The Becoming	Released: February 5, 2013; Label: Fair Trade; CD, digital download	34	16

=== Extended plays ===
List of EP albums, with selected chart positions
Title	Album details	Peak chart positions	
Title	Album details	US Christ	US Heat
To Be Well: Songs for Hope and Healing	Released: 2014; A companion book of the same name was released	—	—

=== Singles ===
Release date	Title	Label
2012	Heaven Waits for Me	Fair Trade
