= Hedley Vicars Storey =

English bookseller and author (1870–1926)

Hedley Vicars Storey (1870–1929) was a British bookseller and author.

== Life ==
Storey was born in Northamptonshire, England. His father admired Captain Hedley Vicars, who fought at Sebastopol, and named his son after the soldier.

Storey married in Islington in 1898.

In 1907, Storey published his first book, Oxford Herald: A Literary Guide for Social Reformers. In 1910 he published two collections of poems through the Shelley Book Agency. Home Once More and other First Poems was dedicated to his wife in the preface dated 7 November 1909 which he wrote whilst at Shelley House in Oxford. The other collection was Britannia Poems, Social, Political and Satirical.

In 1908 Storey along with Cottrell Stephen Frederic Horser (born in 1866) began selling books at 33 High Street Oxford in the shop previously run by James Thornton. Storey left the business at 33 High Street in 1912, which from then on was run by Cottrell Horser alone. Storey moved to London to continue working as a bookseller.

He knew Christopher Sclater Millard, because Millard signed a copy of his bibliography "To my good friend H.V. Storey" in July 1914.

In 1915 Kibble and Co. published Officers and Men. Patriotic Song for which Storey wrote the words.

Storey died in 1929.
