= Story, Nebraska =

Unincorporated community in Nebraska, U.S.

Coordinates: 42°55′48″N 103°56′19″W

Story is an unincorporated community in Sioux County, Nebraska, United States.

== History ==
A post office was established at Story in 1891, and remained in operation until it was discontinued in 1935. The community was named for Solomon R. Story, an early postmaster.
