= Orilla =

Orilla is the name of a number of ships, including:

- SS La Orilla (1942), built as Empire Envoy, in service 1952–55
- SS La Orilla (1943), built as Mohawk Park, in service 1951–52

== See also ==
- Orella (disambiguation)
