= Storey (automobile) =

Storey Machine Tool Co Ltd
- Company type: Private
- Industry: Automotive
- Founded: 1912
- Founder: John Henry Storey
- Headquarters: London, Tonbridge, England
- Key people: William Storey, Jack Storey
- Products: Automobile

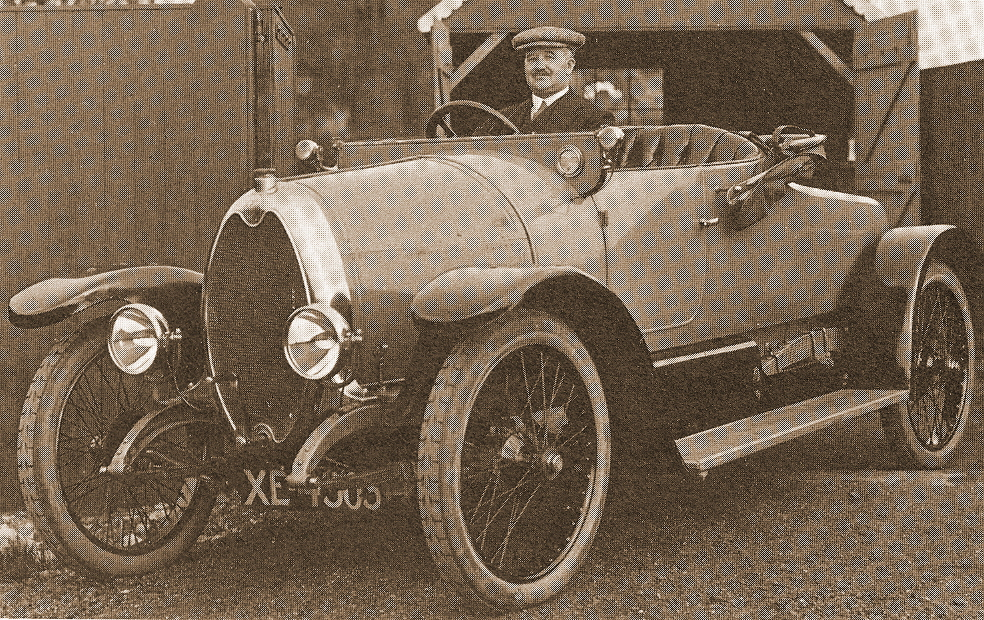
1920 Storey

The Storey was a British car manufacturer operating from 1916 to 1930. The company originally operated from premises at 47 Pomeroy Street, New Cross, London but in 1919 built a new factory in Tonbridge, Kent.

The company was founded by mining engineer John Henry Storey in the 19th Century as John H Storey & Co trading as engineers and toolmakers based at Hatcham in south east London. He was joined at the company by his second son Will in the early years of the 20th century. Will was an early motoring enthusiast and built a few one-off vehicles in the period before 1914. In around 1912 the company name was changed to Storey Machine Tool Co and moved to new premises in New Cross and part of the factory was set aside with a view to car production. This was stopped by the outbreak of World War I when all activities were concentrated on war work. John H Storey died in 1913 and in 1916 a limited company was formed and Will became managing director and his brother Jack joined the management team. Work expanded into the aviation industry and Gnome and Le Rhone aero engines were made.

With peace, the company found itself with a large, well-equipped factory and nothing to make, and the decision was taken to produce cars and on a large scale in a new factory. A 40-acre site was found in Tonbridge, Kent and construction of the new works was underway by 1919. The original New Cross site was kept as a general engineering works and it was here that a prototype car was built powered by a Coventry Simplex engine. A showroom was opened in Kingsway, London and a body shop built adjacent to the Pomeroy Street premises.

The car was formally launched in 1920 and was powered by either a 2815cc or 3817cc Chapuis-Dornier engine with a tax horsepower rating of 14.3 or 20 hp. There was a three or four speed gearbox and the front suspension was conventional semi elliptic springs but at the rear were long cantilevered springs. At the Glasgow Motor Show three cars were exhibited: the 20 hp Tonbridge saloon, the 14.3 hp four-seat Kent tourer and the 20 hp London closed coupe.

By April 1920, the Tonbridge works was fully operational assembling cars from parts made in New Cross and by the end of the year their own 1327cc engine was added to the range. However, the post war boom was coming to an end and many other makers were trying to sell cars and in October the bank called in their overdraft even though the company was trading profitably and forced Storey into liquidation. The Tonbridge works was closed and the contents sold. It was claimed that 1000 cars had been made.

Will Storey was left homeless but brother Jack managed to gather as many parts as possible and from his home in Clapham Park started assembling cars and trading as Storey Motors. As the original engine supply ran out a wide variety of other units was fitted to the cars to keep production going. In 1925 a range of three open sports models was in theory available called the 10/25, 14/40 and 17/70. The cars were still being advertised in 1929 but it is thought that only around 50 were made. After the cessation of car making the company continued as a service station and finally dissolved in 1937.

Will Storey returned to the machine tool industry. He died in 1971. Jack Storey died in 1962 at the age of 83.
