= César Povolny =

German-French footballer (born 1914)

Personal information
- Full name: César Povolny
- Date of birth: 19 July 1914
- Place of birth: Recklinghausen, Germany
- Position: Defender

International career
Years	Team	Apps	(Gls)
- France

César Povolny, also known as Czeslaw Povolny and listed as Martin Povolny (born 19 July 1914, date of death unknown), was a German-French association footballer. He played for Le Havre AC. Povolny is deceased.

== International career ==
Povolny was born in Recklinghausen to parents of Polish descent, and emigrated to France. Povolny was selected for the 1938 FIFA World Cup, but did not earn any caps for the France national football team.
