= Margaret Storey (children's writer) =

British writer (1926–2022)

Elizabeth Margaret Storey (27 June 1926 – 28 September 2022) was a British author of books for children and young adults published by Faber.

== Biography ==
Elizabeth Margaret Storey was born on 26 June 1926. She attended Girton College in Cambridge in 1948 to gain a BA Honours degree in English, and thereafter worked as an English teacher.

Neil Gaiman has cited her as an influence: "Margaret Storey is more or less out of print these days, alas. I loved her when I was about seven or eight, and am looking forward to finding out how much of her stuff has wound up in mine."

Her work included a fantasy series based on the adventures of two children, Timothy and Ellen, and a witch named Melinda Farbright: "the real thing – strange and magical, and above all, dangerous".

- Timothy and Two Witches (1966) - Illustrated by Charles W. Stewart
- The Stone Wizard aka "The Stone Sorcerer" (1967) - Illustrated by Charles W. Stewart
- The Dragon's Sister and Timothy Travels (1967) - Illustrated by Charles W. Stewart
- A Quarrel of Witches (1970 - Illustrated by Doreen Roberts
- The Sleeping Witch (1971) - Illustrated by Janina Ede
- A War of Wizards (1976) - Illustrated by Janina Ede
- The Double Wizard (1979) - Illustrated by June Jackson

She also wrote:

- Pauline (1965)
- Wrong Gear (1973)
- Keep Running (1974)
- Kate And The Family Tree (1965) - illustrated by Shirley Hughes
- The Smallest Doll (1966) - illustrated by Shirley Hughes
- The Smallest Bridesmaid (1966) - illustrated by Shirley Hughes
- The Mollyday Holiday (1971) - Illustrated by Janina Ede

Pauline, about an orphan forced to live with uncomprehending relatives, has been described as "an astonishingly mature novel for a new writer".

She should not be confused with the mystery writer Margaret Storey, who has written a number of books, sometimes under the pseudonym Elizabeth Eyre with the author Jill Staynes.

Storey died on 28 September 2022, at the age of 96.
