= Tom Storey =

English footballer

Personal information
- Full name: Thomas Storey
- Date of birth: 23 November 1914
- Place of birth: Foulridge, Colne, England
- Height: 5 ft 7 in (1.70 m)
- Position: Winger

Senior career*
Years	Team	Apps	(Gls)
- Darwen
- Nelson
1935–1938	Burnley	35	(7)
1938–1939	Accrington Stanley	26	(3)
Total		61	(10)
- * Club domestic league appearances and goals

Thomas Storey (23 November 1914 – ?) was an English professional footballer who played as a winger.
