= Elizabeth Eyre =

British writer

- Occupation: N/A
- Writing career
- Pen name: Elizabeth Eyre is a pseudonym of Jill Staynes and Margaret Storey.
- Genres: Mysteries, historical

Elizabeth Eyre is a pseudonym used by the authors Jill Staynes (1927–2013) and Margaret Storey (born c. 1927) for their Sigismondo series of novels.

== Biography ==
From the dust jacket of Bravo for the Bride (1994):

Elizabeth Eyre is the pseudonym of Jill Staynes and Margaret Storey. They were pupils at the same school where they invented bizarre characters and exchanged serial episodes about them. Their first book together, at the age of fifteen, was called 'Bungho, or why we went to Aleppo'. It was not offered for publication. They have both written stories for children, and together created the highly praised Superintendent Bone modern detective novels as well as this series of Italian Renaissance whodunits.

== Writing style ==
The Eyre novels are marked by colourful characters and an atmospheric treatment of the Italian Renaissance setting. While some characters are clearly intended as comic relief, the humour is dry and unobtrusive. The stories themselves are carefully plotted and well thought out.

The work should not be confused with that of Margaret Storey – an author of books for children and young adults who wrote the magic realism series of "Tim and Melinda" books.

== Critical response ==
The Sigismondo series received a positive response from many reviewers when it was released, with good reviews appearing in the Sunday Express (London) and the Weekend Telegraph (London), some of which were reprinted on the dust jackets of the later volumes in the series.

== Influence on popular culture ==
The books contributed to the historical mystery subgenre that arose in the 1990s with the success of Ellis Peters and the Cadfael series and Lindsey Davis and the Marcus Didius Falco series.

Although well received at the time of their release, the books now appear to be out of print, though many are still available through libraries and second-hand book traders.

== Bibliography ==
- Death of the Duchess 1991
- Curtains for the Cardinal 1992
- Poison for the Prince 1993
- Bravo for the Bride 1994
- Axe for an Abbot 1995
- Dirge for a Doge 1996
