= George Storey =

English rugby league footballer

Playing information
Club
Years	Team	Pld	T	G	FG	P
1947–52	Castleford	11	0	0	0	0

George Storey is a former professional rugby league footballer who played in the 1940s and 1950s. He played at club level for Castleford.
