= George Story (priest) =

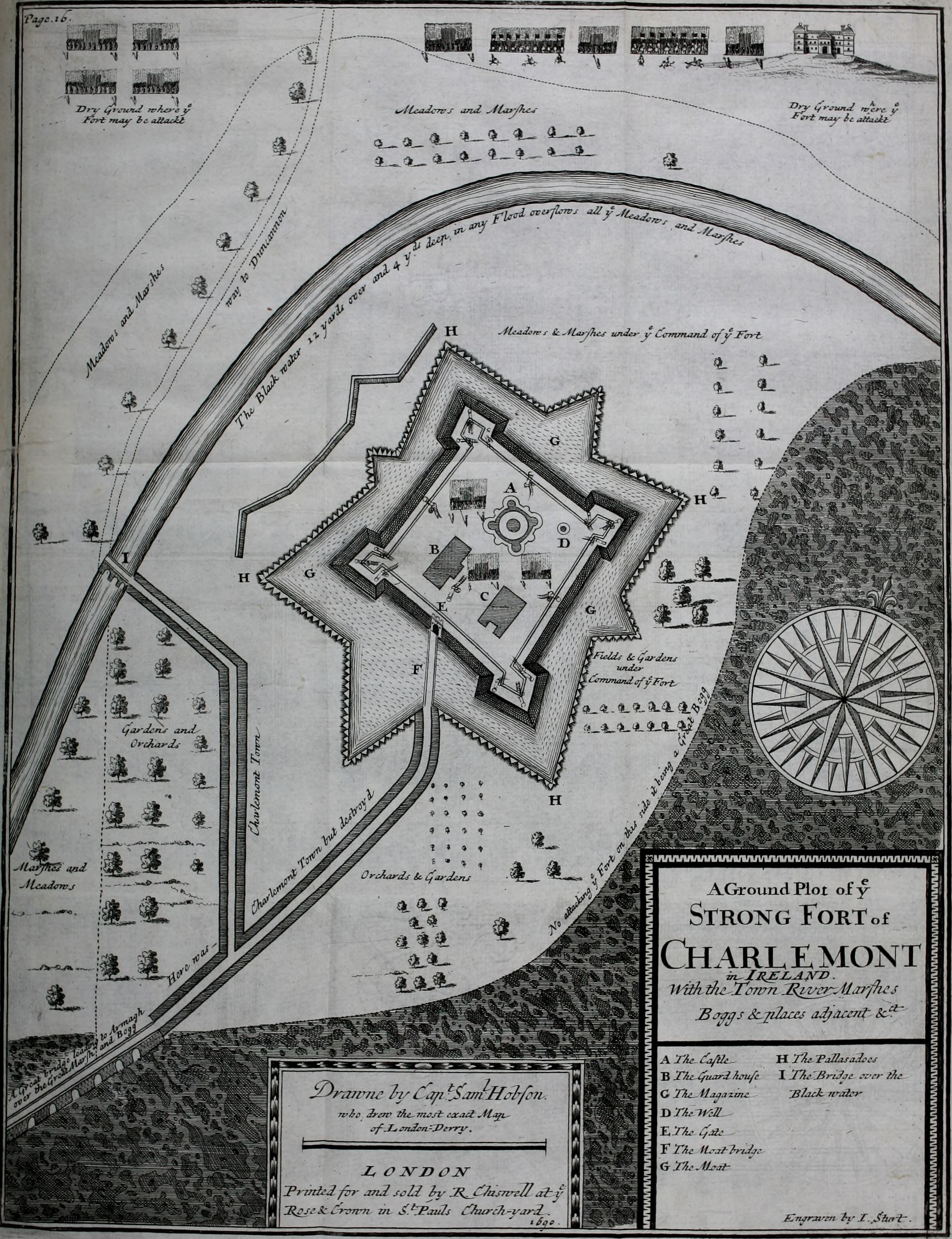
An impartial history of the wars of Ireland, by George Story.

George Warter Story (1664?–1721) was an English clergyman, known for his history of the Williamite War in Ireland, of which he was an eye witness.

== Life ==
He was eldest son of Thomas Story of Justice Town, near Carlisle, Cumberland; Thomas Story the Quaker was a younger brother. In 1688 George Story was chaplain to the Countess-dowager of Carlisle at Castle Howard. He was in London when the army for Ireland was being raised in March and April 1689, and accompanied Meinhardt Schomberg, 3rd Duke of Schomberg in August, as chaplain to Sir Thomas Gower's regiment of foot. Gower died early in 1690, and Henry Hamilton-Moore, 3rd Earl of Drogheda succeeded him in the command. the survivors of two regiments being fused into one.

Story was at the Battle of the Boyne, and served with Lord Drogheda while the war lasted. A younger brother, who was ensign in the same regiment, was killed near Birr in June 1691. After the surrender of Limerick in November 1691, Story's regiment marched to Ulster; and when the war was over they remained in the north as part of the standing army.

In December 1694 Story was appointed Dean of Connor. Subsequently he sometimes visited Carlisle, where he had a living, his curate being a deprived Scots episcopal clergyman whom Story's father took into his home. On 7 April 1705 Story was instituted Dean of Limerick, and moved from Connor. Story was careful of the privileges of his church, and in 1715 established his right to swear in the vicars-choral, notwithstanding the usurpation of successive bishops. In June 1716 he entertained his brother Thomas at Limerick.

Story died on 19 November 1721. He had inherited Justice Town, and left it to his widow, who sold it to Thomas Story in 1723. She was Catherine, daughter and coheiress of Edward Warter of Bilboa, near Doon, County Limerick; the Warters' residence had been burned by some of Patrick Sarsfield's men.

== Works ==
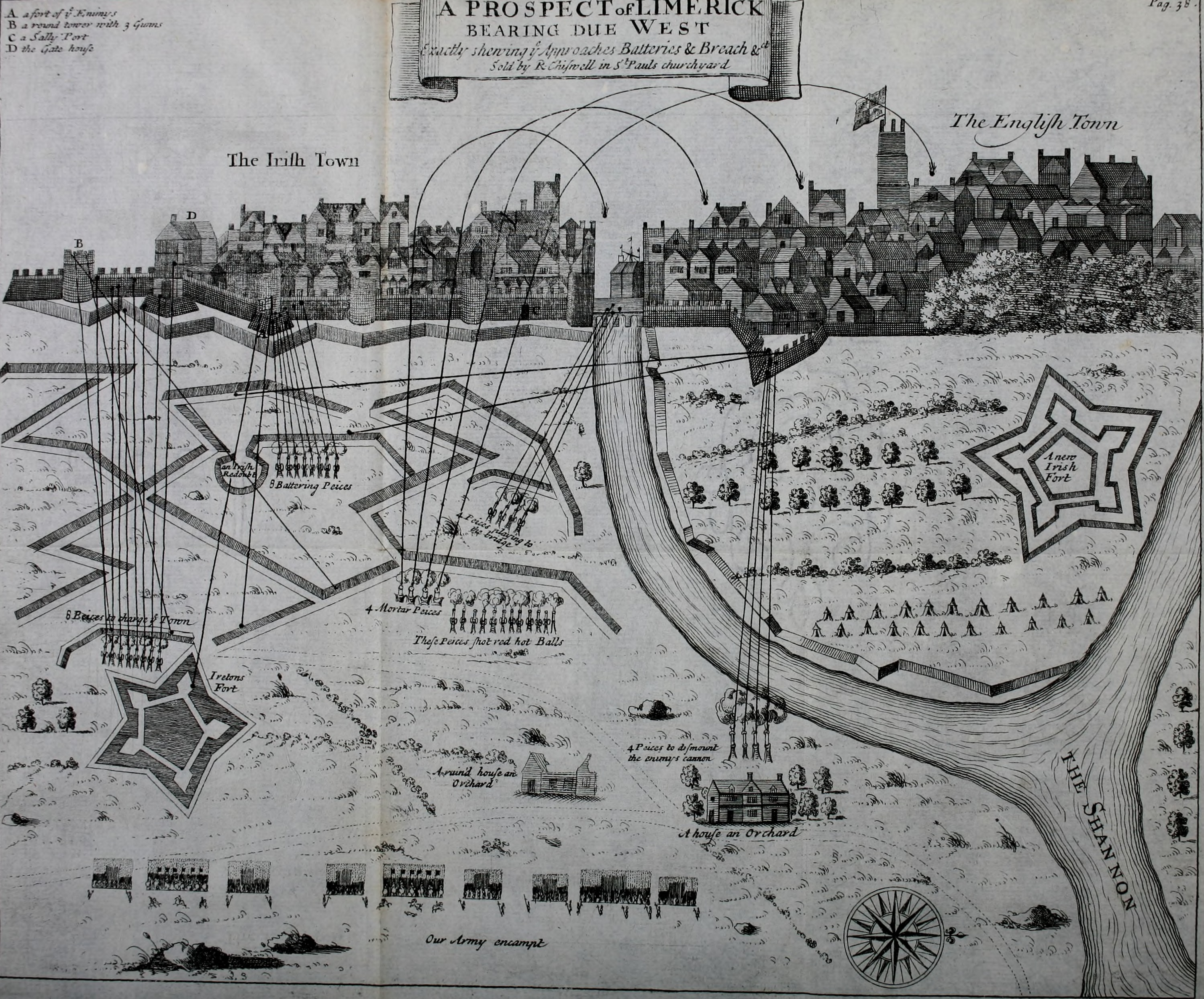
An impartial history of the wars of Ireland.

Story's ‘History’ is an authority for the war in Ireland on the Williamite side. The first part, entitled ‘An Impartial History,’ which goes down to January 1690–1, was licensed in London on 30 April 1691. A second edition was published with the ‘Continuation’ early in 1693. The ‘Continuation’ has maps, some by Captain Samuel Hobson. Story dedicated the later work to William III. His account ends with the official close of the war by proclamation on 23 March 1691–2.

Story wrote from a Protestant and Whig perspective. He was an apologist for Schomberg, who was criticised for his reluctance to risk raw troops in a pitched battle, and for the number of men lost to disease. On 23 October 1714 he preached in London at St. Dunstan's in Fleet Street, on the day appointed by the Irish parliament to give thanks for deliverance from the massacre of 1641. He urged the Irish Protestants in his congregation, and who belonged to both political parties, to bury the hatchet in Queen Anne's grave and to unite in support of the Hanoverian succession; the sermon was published ‘at the request of the stewards and several of the gentlemen of Ireland.'
