= Sioux County, Nebraska =

County in Nebraska, United States

- County
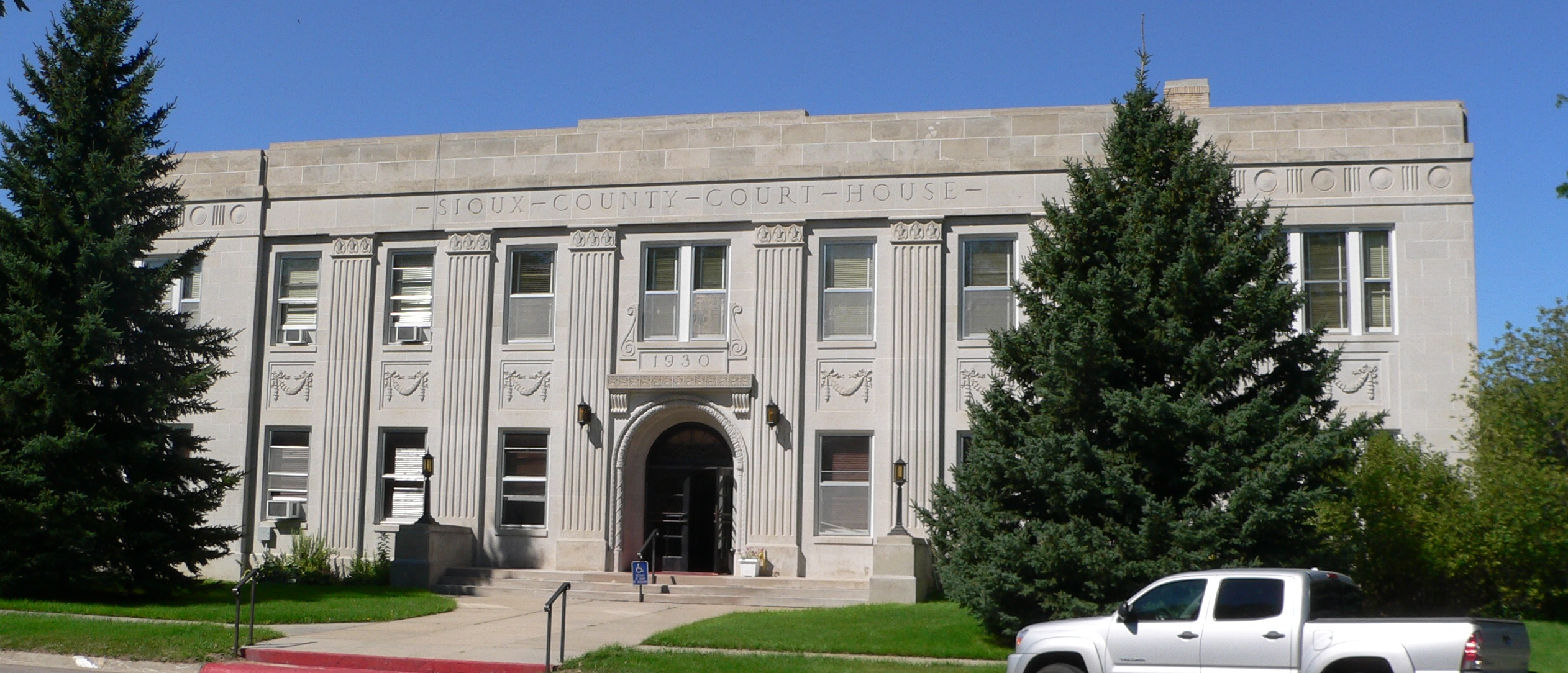
- The Sioux County Courthouse in Harrison

- Location within the U.S. state of Nebraska
- Coordinates: 42.470668°N 103.73217°W
- Country: United States
- State: Nebraska
- Created: February 19, 1877
- Organized: October 1, 1886
- Named for: Sioux people
- Seat: Harrison
- Largest village: Harrison

Area
  - Total: 2,067.365 sq mi (5,354.45 km^{2})
  - Land: 2,066.723 sq mi (5,352.79 km^{2})
  - Water: 0.642 sq mi (1.66 km^{2}) 0.03%

Population (2020)
  - Total: 1,135
  - Estimate (2025): 1,188 ▲
  - Density: 0.5492/sq mi (0.2120/km^{2})
- Time zone: UTC−7 (Mountain)
  - Summer (DST): UTC−6 (MDT)
- Area code: 308
- Congressional district: 3rd
- Website: siouxcountyne.gov
- • Nebraska county number 83 • Nebraska license plate prefix 80

Sioux County is a county in the U.S. state of Nebraska. As of the 2020 census, the population was 1,135, and was estimated to be 1,188 in 2025. The county seat and the largest village is Harrison.

Sioux County is included in the Scottsbluff, NE micropolitan area.

In the Nebraska license plate system, Sioux County was represented by the prefix "80" (as it had the 80th-largest number of vehicles registered in the state when the license plate system was established in 1922).

== History ==
Sioux County was created on February 19, 1877 and organized on October 1, 1886.

== Geography ==
According to the United States Census Bureau, the county has a total area of 2,067.365 square miles (5,354.45 km^{2}), of which 2,066.723 square miles (5,352.79 km^{2}) is land and 0.642 square miles (1.66 km^{2}) (0.03%) is water. It is the sixth-largest county in Nebraska by total area.

Sioux County lies at the NW corner of Nebraska. Its north boundary line abuts the south line of the state of South Dakota and its west boundary line abuts the east boundary line of the state of Wyoming. The Niobrara River flows southeastward and eastward through the upper central part of the county. The county terrain is arid low rolling hills, sloping to the east and southeast. The terrain is sparsely utilized for agriculture, with some center pivot irrigation used.

=== Major highways ===
- US 20
- US 26
- N-2
- N-29
- N-71

=== Protected areas ===
- Agate Fossil Beds National Monument
- Fort Robinson State Park (part)
- Gilbert-Baker Wildlife Area
- Nebraska National Forest (part)
- Peterson State Wildlife Area
  - Soldier Creek Wilderness
- Oglala National Grassland (part)
  - Toadstool Geologic Park
  - Hudson-Meng Bison Kill

=== Adjacent counties ===
- Fall River County, South Dakota – north
- Dawes County – northeast
- Box Butte County – southeast
- Scotts Bluff County – south
- Goshen County, Wyoming – southwest
- Niobrara County, Wyoming – northwest

== Demographics ==
Historical population
Census	Pop.	Note	%±
1880	699		—
1890	2,452		250.8%
1900	2,055		−16.2%
1910	5,599		172.5%
1920	4,528		−19.1%
1930	4,667		3.1%
1940	4,001		−14.3%
1950	3,124		−21.9%
1960	2,575		−17.6%
1970	2,034		−21.0%
1980	1,845		−9.3%
1990	1,549		−16.0%
2000	1,475		−4.8%
2010	1,311		−11.1%
2020	1,135		−13.4%
2025 (est.)	1,188	▲	4.7%
U.S. Decennial Census; 1790–1960 1900–1990; 1990–2000 2010–2020

As of the third quarter of 2025, the median home value in Sioux County was $158,088.

As of the 2024 American Community Survey, there are 490 estimated households in Sioux County with an average of 2.39 persons per household. The county has a median household income of $53,929. Approximately 14.9% of the county's population lives at or below the poverty line. Sioux County has an estimated % employment rate, with 22.4% of the population holding a bachelor's degree or higher and 94.4% holding a high school diploma. There were 687 housing units at an average density of 0.33 per square mile (0.1/km^{2}).

The top five reported languages (people were allowed to report up to two languages, thus the figures will generally add to more than 100%) were English (98.7%), Spanish (1.3%), Indo-European (0.0%), Asian and Pacific Islander (0.0%), and Other (0.0%).

The median age in the county was 43.7 years.

Sioux County, Nebraska – racial and ethnic composition Note: the US Census treats Hispanic/Latino as an ethnic category. This table excludes Latinos from the racial categories and assigns them to a separate category. Hispanics/Latinos may be of any race.
Race / ethnicity (NH = non-Hispanic)	Pop. 1980	Pop. 1990	Pop. 2000	Pop. 2010	Pop. 2020
White alone (NH)	1,757 (95.23%)	1,501 (96.90%)	1,424 (96.54%)	1,240 (94.58%)	1,055 (92.95%)
Black or African American alone (NH)	2 (0.11%)	0 (0.00%)	0 (0.00%)	1 (0.08%)	0 (0.00%)
Native American or Alaska Native alone (NH)	2 (0.11%)	1 (0.06%)	1 (0.07%)	2 (0.15%)	2 (0.18%)
Asian alone (NH)	5 (0.27%)	2 (0.13%)	3 (0.20%)	1 (0.08%)	4 (0.35%)
Pacific Islander alone (NH)	—	—	0 (0.00%)	0 (0.00%)	2 (0.18%)
Other race alone (NH)	5 (0.27%)	1 (0.06%)	0 (0.00%)	0 (0.00%)	4 (0.35%)
Mixed race or multiracial (NH)	—	—	13 (0.88%)	15 (1.14%)	25 (2.20%)
Hispanic or Latino (any race)	74 (4.01%)	44 (2.84%)	34 (2.31%)	52 (3.97%)	43 (3.79%)
Total	1,845 (100.00%)	1,549 (100.00%)	1,475 (100.00%)	1,311 (100.00%)	1,135 (100.00%)

=== 2024 estimate ===
As of the 2024 estimate, there were 1,099 people, 490 households, and _ families residing in the county. The population density was 0.53 inhabitants per square mile (0.2/km^{2}). There were 687 housing units at an average density of 0.33 per square mile (0.1/km^{2}). The racial makeup of the county was 95.4% White (90.2% NH White), 0.5% African American, 1.6% Native American, 0.5% Asian, 0.0% Pacific Islander, _% from some other races and 2.0% from two or more races. Hispanic or Latino people of any race were 6.6% of the population.

=== 2020 census ===
As of the 2020 census, there were 1,135 people, 515 households, and 347 families residing in the county. The population density was 0.55 inhabitants per square mile (0.2/km^{2}). There were 705 housing units at an average density of 0.34 per square mile (0.1/km^{2}). The racial makeup of the county was 93.83% White, 0.00% African American, 0.18% Native American, 0.35% Asian, 0.18% Pacific Islander, 1.59% from some other races and 3.88% from two or more races. Hispanic or Latino people of any race were 3.79% of the population.

The median age was 47.9 years. 20.3% of residents were under the age of 18 and 26.3% of residents were 65 years of age or older. For every 100 females there were 106.4 males, and for every 100 females age 18 and over there were 101.1 males age 18 and over.

0.0% of residents lived in urban areas, while 100.0% lived in rural areas.

There were 515 households in the county, of which 24.9% had children under the age of 18 living with them and 17.5% had a female householder with no spouse or partner present. About 28.7% of all households were made up of individuals and 14.7% had someone living alone who was 65 years of age or older.

There were 705 housing units, of which 27.0% were vacant. Among occupied housing units, 71.1% were owner-occupied and 28.9% were renter-occupied. The homeowner vacancy rate was 1.1% and the rental vacancy rate was 12.1%.

=== 2010 census ===
As of the 2010 census, there were 1,311 people, 577 households, and 409 families residing in the county. The population density was 0.63 inhabitants per square mile (0.2/km^{2}). There were 815 housing units at an average density of 0.39 per square mile (0.2/km^{2}). The racial makeup of the county was 96.11% White, 0.08% African American, 0.15% Native American, 0.08% Asian, 0.00% Pacific Islander, 2.44% from some other races and 1.14% from two or more races. Hispanic or Latino people of any race were 3.97% of the population.

=== 2000 census ===
As of the 2000 census, there were 1,475 people, 605 households, and 444 families residing in the county. The population density was 0.71 inhabitants per square mile (0.3/km^{2}). There were 780 housing units at an average density of 0.38 per square mile (0.1/km^{2}). The racial makeup of the county was 97.63% White, 0.00% African American, 0.14% Native American, 0.20% Asian, 0.00% Pacific Islander, 1.15% from some other races and 0.88% from two or more races. Hispanic or Latino people of any race were 2.31% of the population. 36.9% were of German, 11.3% Irish, 11.0% American and 10.6% English ancestry.

There were 605 households, out of which 28.10% had children under the age of 18 living with them, 65.30% were married couples living together, 5.10% had a female householder with no husband present, and 26.60% were non-families. 23.60% of all households were made up of individuals, and 9.40% had someone living alone who was 65 years of age or older. The average household size was 2.44 and the average family size was 2.86.

The county population contained 24.30% under the age of 18, 7.20% from 18 to 24, 24.70% from 25 to 44, 27.50% from 45 to 64, and 16.20% who were 65 years of age or older. The median age was 42 years. For every 100 females there were 111.00 males. For every 100 females age 18 and over, there were 102.20 males.

The median income for a household in the county was $29,851, and the median income for a family was $31,406. Males had a median income of $23,409 versus $21,490 for females. The per capita income for the county was $15,999. About 11.10% of families and 15.40% of the population were below the poverty line, including 24.40% of those under age 18 and 7.50% of those age 65 or over.

== Communities ==
=== Towns ===
- Harrison (county seat)

=== Unincorporated communities ===
- Agate
- Andrews
- Glen
- Joder
- Story

=== Ghost towns ===
- Montrose
- Orella

== Politics ==
Sioux County voters are reliably Republican. In no national election since 1936 has the county selected the Democratic Party candidate. In 2020, Donald Trump won the highest share of the vote ever in the county, with 87.8% of the vote.

Political Party	Number of registered voters (March 1, 2026)	Percent
Republican	676	81.45%
Independent	87	10.48%
Democratic	60	7.23%
Libertarian	6	0.72%
Legal Marijuana Now	1	0.12%
Total	830	100.00%

United States presidential election results for Sioux County, Nebraska
Year	Republican		Democratic		Third party(ies)	
Year	No.	%	No.	%	No.	%
1900	199	44.42%	248	55.36%	1	0.22%
1904	247	62.06%	111	27.89%	40	10.05%
1908	516	50.84%	464	45.71%	35	3.45%
1912	150	15.14%	375	37.84%	466	47.02%
1916	344	30.50%	737	65.34%	47	4.17%
1920	627	64.97%	252	26.11%	86	8.91%
1924	480	36.01%	149	11.18%	704	52.81%
1928	1,178	72.54%	435	26.79%	11	0.68%
1932	667	39.14%	1,006	59.04%	31	1.82%
1936	674	40.65%	956	57.66%	28	1.69%
1940	1,072	63.43%	618	36.57%	0	0.00%
1944	876	68.22%	408	31.78%	0	0.00%
1948	657	55.82%	520	44.18%	0	0.00%
1952	1,093	78.46%	300	21.54%	0	0.00%
1956	499	65.74%	260	34.26%	0	0.00%
1960	745	64.22%	415	35.78%	0	0.00%
1964	698	64.81%	379	35.19%	0	0.00%
1968	565	71.43%	157	19.85%	69	8.72%
1972	639	83.20%	129	16.80%	0	0.00%
1976	532	60.25%	329	37.26%	22	2.49%
1980	760	81.55%	120	12.88%	52	5.58%
1984	732	85.12%	121	14.07%	7	0.81%
1988	568	74.05%	194	25.29%	5	0.65%
1992	445	55.49%	148	18.45%	209	26.06%
1996	551	71.74%	138	17.97%	79	10.29%
2000	629	83.64%	98	13.03%	25	3.32%
2004	677	83.68%	123	15.20%	9	1.11%
2008	603	82.38%	117	15.98%	12	1.64%
2012	624	84.44%	101	13.67%	14	1.89%
2016	616	83.70%	81	11.01%	39	5.30%
2020	642	87.82%	72	9.85%	17	2.33%
2024	597	87.79%	77	11.32%	6	0.88%

== Education ==
School districts include:

- Crawford Public Schools #71, Crawford
- Mitchell Public Schools #31, Mitchell
- Morrill Public Schools #11, Morrill
- Sioux County Public Schools #500, Harrison

== See also ==
- National Register of Historic Places listings in Sioux County, NE
