= Spade Ranch =

Spade Ranch may refer to:

- Spade Ranch, Camp Geronimo, Arizona
- Spade Ranch (Nebraska)
  - Spade Ranch Store
- Spade Ranch (Texas)
