= Kinkaid Act =

1904 U.S. legislative statute

- Other short titles: Kinkaid Amendment of 1904 · Act of April 28, 1904
- Long title: An Act To amend the homestead laws as to certain public lands in the State of Nebraska.
- Enacted by: the 58th United States Congress
- Effective: June 28, 1904

Citations
- Public law: Chapter 1801
- Statutes at Large: 33 Stat. 547

Codification
- Acts amended: Homestead Act of 1862
- U.S.C. sections created: Former 43 U.S.C. § 224

Legislative history
- Introduced in the House as H.R. 8139 by R‑NE Moses Kinkaidth on December 1903; Committee consideration by House Committee on Public Lands; Passed the House on April 1904 (Voice vote); Passed the Senate on April 1904 (Voice vote); Signed into law by President Theodore Roosevelt on April 28, 1904

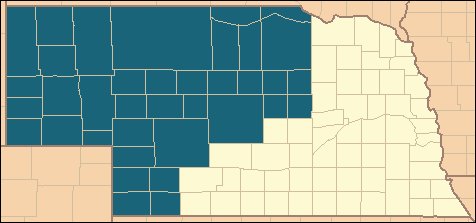
Western Nebraska counties to which the Kinkaid Act applied.

The Kinkaid Act of 1904 (ch. 1801, 33 Stat. 547, Apr. 28, 1904, 43 U.S.C. § 224) is a U.S. statute that amended the 1862 Homestead Act so that one section (1 mi^{2}, 2.6 km^{2}, 640 acres) of public domain land could be acquired free of charge, apart from a modest filing fee. It applied specifically to 37 counties in northwest Nebraska, in the general area of the Nebraska Sandhills. The act was introduced by Moses Kinkaid, Nebraska's 6th congressional district representative, was signed into law by President Theodore Roosevelt on April 28, 1904 and went into effect on June 28 of that year.

== Provisions ==
The legal provisions of the Kinkaid Act were very similar to those of the Homestead Act. A claimant had to be at least 21 years of age (or 18 if the head of a household), a current U.S. citizen, or had to have started the process of becoming a citizen. Five years of residency was required to gain title to a claim, with exceptions made to account for years of military service. In 1912 the residency requirement was shortened to three years, in order to attract more settlers. A claimant also had to prove that improvements equivalent to $1.25 per acre had been made to the property.

Only non-irrigable lands were eligible to be claimed under the provisions of the Kinkaid Act; those that were deemed to be practicably irrigable by the Secretary of the Interior were excluded. A 640-acre claim was required to be as compact as possible, and less than two miles in length. A homesteader who already held land in the area at the time of enactment could accumulate additional surrounding available territory in order to acquire a total homestead unit of 640 acres.

Commutation (paying cash instead of occupying a claim for the full five years, which had been permitted under the 1862 Homestead Act) was not allowed under the Kinkaid Act.

Claimants of land under the provisions of the Kinkaid Act were generally referred to as "Kinkaiders."

The Kinkaid Act was repealed on October 21, 1976 (Pub. L. 94–579, title VII, § 702, Oct. 21, 1976, 90 Stat. 2787). The final patent was issued in 1941 on 40 acres (16 ha) of land.

== Background ==
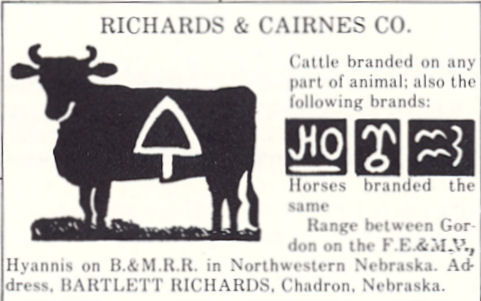
Spade Ranch brand

The economy of the Nebraska Sandhills region in the late 19th century was dominated by the cattle ranching industry. Large ranches dotted the landscape, utilizing largely-unclaimed lands in the public domain. Ranchers would file claims on lands with water access, and use the surrounding public pastures for grazing. Large stockmen sometimes used fraudulent homestead filings from employees and other individuals in order to gain title to surrounding land. A shack would be erected on these fraudulent claims and the claimant would stay there once every six months in order to claim residency. A common tactic was to gain title to a thin strip of land surrounding a large pasture in the public domain; the pasture would then be used for grazing purposes. This prevented anyone else from grazing their cattle in the enclosed area and discouraged homesteaders from claiming the land. Bartlett Richards and William Comstock, who formed the Spade Ranch, were famous for tactics such as these.

Due to the immense land holdings required for large cattle operations, the population of the Sandhills region decreased by 10% between 1890 and 1900, and millions of acres remained in the public domain. To address this issue, William Neville, a populist congressman from North Platte, Nebraska, introduced legislation in 1902 that would amend the Homestead Law to allow an individual to take a homestead of 1,280 acres in the arid and nonirrigable lands west of the 100th meridian. The bill never made it to the floor for debate.

In his 1902 address to congress, President Theodore Roosevelt made it a priority to settle the "public land problem." He appointed a Public Lands Commission in 1903 to look into the issue and recommend solutions. The commission concluded that current land laws had been framed to accommodate humid regions, while the remaining public lands were arid in character. New land laws would be needed to settle the arid lands west of the 100th meridian.

== Passage of the Kinkaid Act ==
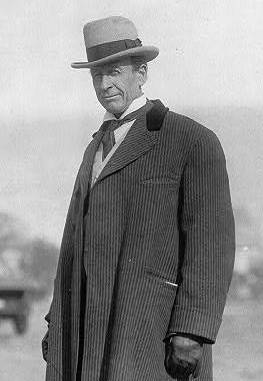
Moses Kinkaid

Moses Kinkaid, a congressman from the sixth district of Nebraska, introduced a bill "to amend the homestead laws as to certain unappropriated and unreserved lands in Nebraska" on April 6, 1904. The original bill provided for 1,280 acre homesteads, but the Committee on the Public Lands limited the size to 640 acres. The committee felt that 640 acres would be a good initial experiment size for dry-land farming, and the act could be amended in the future if more land were needed.

Kinkaid stated that the bill had three primary purposes: to get the lands into the hands of individuals and thus make the land taxable; to end the fencing and claim fraud controversies over the land; and to build up the communities in the region. It was a bill meant for "the disposition of sandy and arid lands in western Nebraska," which were too difficult to irrigate. It specifically applied to the Sandhills region of Nebraska, which is approximately the northwestern two-thirds of the state. All of the land was west of the 98th meridian. Only non-irrigable lands were open for entry; those that were deemed irrigable were not eligible.

The bill passed on April 28, 1904. Approximately 11,000,000 acres (4,500,000 ha) of land was made available within the area of the Kinkaid Act. An additional 1,000,000 acres (400,000 ha) of land was withdrawn due to potential irrigability.

== Mixed results in the Sandhills region ==
An immediate land rush followed the passage of the act. One of the land offices in the region was at Alliance, in Box Butte County. The first day to claim an entry was June 28, 1904. There were reportedly 400 people in line at the Alliance office on the initial day, and the original line was not completely processed until 3:00 pm on June 30. In April 1905, the Western Nebraska Observer of Kimball reported that there was a construction boom in Kimball County, which was within the territory of the Kinkaid Act. The North Platte Telegraph reported in 1906 that merchants had been having their most profitable months ever due to the influx of new residents.

In her book Old Jules, a memoir about living in the Sandhills region at the turn of the century, Mari Sandoz describes the scene as land was initially opened for settlement:

Two weeks before opening, covered wagons, horsebackers, men afoot, toiled into Alliance, got information at the land office, and vanished eastward over the level prairie. Many turned back at the first soft yellow chophills, pockmarked by blowouts and warted with soapweeds. Others kept on, through this protective border, into the broad valley region, with high hills reaching towards the whitish sky.

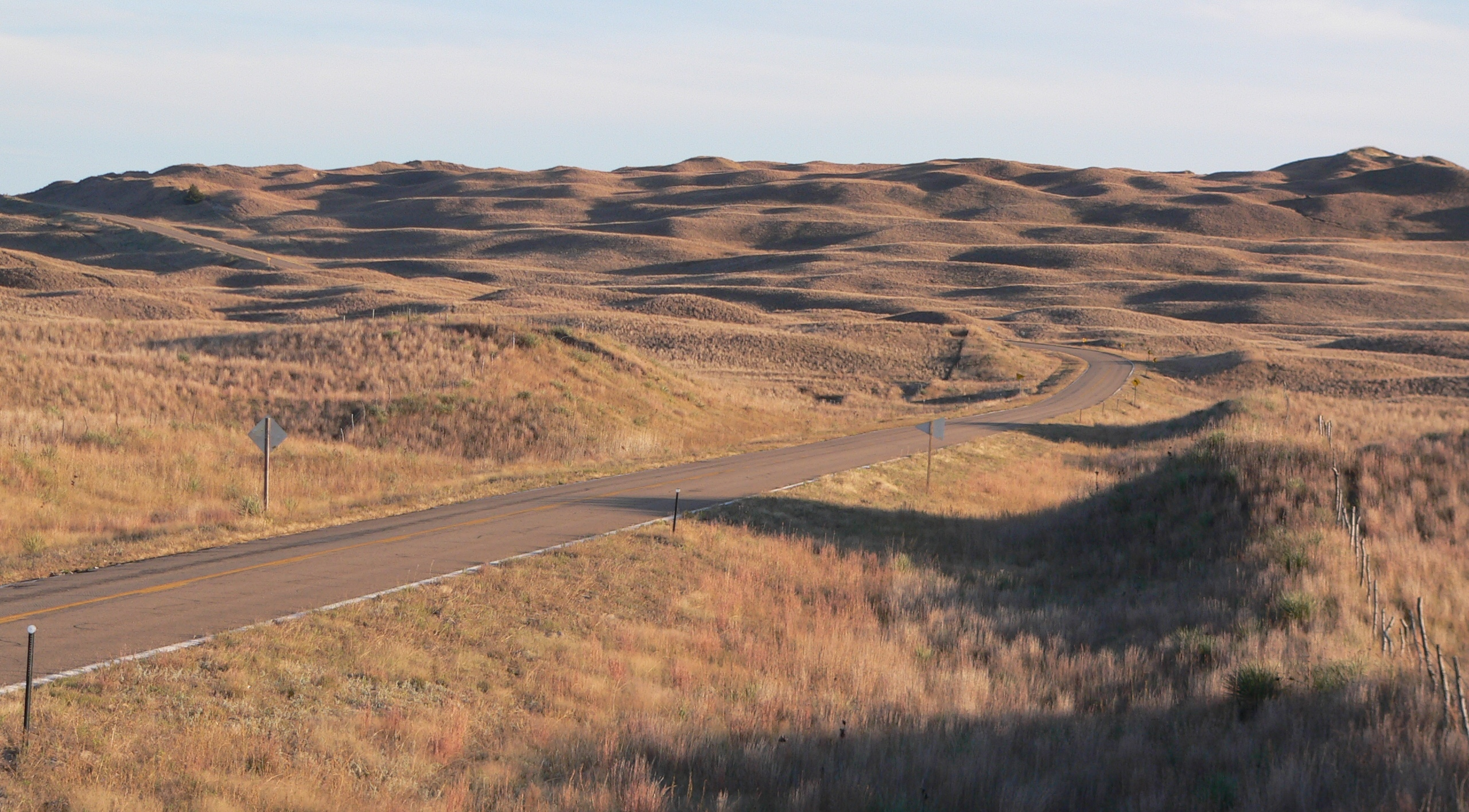
Nebraska Sandhills in October

Population rapidly increased in the 37 counties where the law was applicable:

- 1890: 124,508
- 1900: 107,434
- 1904: Passage of Kinkaid Act
- 1910: 162,217

Nearly all of the public lands in the region were claimed by 1912. All that remained were extremely isolated or undesirable sections. Between November 1910 and 1917, a total of 18,919 land patents were issued for 8,933,257 acres (3,615,161 ha) of land.

Some observers question the success of the Kinkaid Act in bringing new settlers into the region. There were widespread reports by 1914 that 90% of Kinkaid patents had been taken over by large stockmen (ranchers). Some argued that it was impossible to maintain a successful ranching operation in the region with only 640 acres of land. But, many of these statements were made by established cattle ranchers and industry representatives who were originally opposed to the Kinkaid Act.

In congressional testimony from 1914, Moses Kinkaid reported that the sentiment of settlers in the region was that most of the claims remained in the hands of individual families. He reported that the region's communities held many small festivals each year, where Kinkaid homesteaders would meet and display their agricultural products.

He described the average Kinkaid homesteader as a small family farmer:

They get cows, so far as they are able, and they go into dairying – those that are able to buy cattle enough to go into the stock business do so. They plow what we call the valleys ... They raise cane a good deal for feeding, and in some places alfalfa.

He estimated that the average Kinkaid homesteader had 15 to 40 head of cattle on 640 acres.

Kinkaid's observations were supported by a 1915 report compiled by the Agricultural Experiment Station at the University of Nebraska. It found that only 200,000 acres (81,000 ha) were remaining in the public domain within the boundaries of the Kinkaid Act, and no sites that had 640 contiguous acres available. A 1917 report from the Department of Interior reviewed the results from the first ten years after the Kinkaid Act, from 1904 to 1914. It found the following results:

- Areas in the hands of small holders: 6,422,963 acres (2,599,281 ha)
- Areas in the hands of large holders: 303,553 acres (122,844 ha)
- Areas in the hands of original entrymen: 4,589,871 acres (1,857,455 ha)
- Total area proved up: 9,726,516 acres (3,936,181 ha)

The report showed that a majority of the land was in the hands of small holders, and approximately half the acreage was still owned by the original claimants. The report also showed evidence of a general increase of economic activity for the region:

- Increase in value of cattle: 34 percent
- Increase in acres planted to rye: 92 percent
- Increase in acres planted to oats: 80 percent
- Increase in acres planted to corn: 102 percent
- Increase in acres planted to wheat: 142 percent
- Increase in voting population: 55 percent
- Total property valuations increased by 108 percent between 1904 and 1914, compared with 17 percent from 1892 to 1904

While the Kinkaid Act stimulated an immediate burst in economic activity for the region, this was mostly temporary. Because of the difficulties in dry-land farming on such small plots, many Kinkaid homesteaders eventually failed in their attempts to raise crops, and usually sold out to large ranchers. For example, there were 377 farms in Holt County in 1913, but only 144 in 1914. This pattern repeated itself throughout the region.

The Kinkaid Act did convert land to private ownership from the public domain, but its goal of populating the region with small family farms had mixed results. Government officials were apparently pleased with the outcome of the Kinkaid Act, as it served as the blueprint for multiple other western land acts, most notably the Enlarged Homestead Act of 1909 and the Stock-Raising Homestead Act of 1916. Since that time, increasingly only large-scale industrial ranching and farming has been successful on the Great Plains. The area has become depopulated with the decline of small farms, and some towns have become defunct.

== See also ==
- Black homesteaders

== Works cited ==
- Grazing Homesteads and the Regulation of Grazing on the Public Lands: Hearing Before the Committee on the Public Lands. Washington: Government Printing Office. 1915. p. 1. "kinkaid act grazing homesteads."
- Hooker County Historical Society (1989). Hooker County, Nebraska: The First 100 Years. Curtis Media Corp. p. 2.
- Kay, John. "Renaissance Survey Final Report of Logan County, Nebraska" (PDF). Nebraska State Historical Society. Archived from the original on November 16, 2006.
- Keener, John (1916). Public Land Statutes of the United States. Washington: Government Printing Office. "kinkaid act."
- Opie, John (1987). The Law of the Land: Two Hundred Years of American Farmland Policy. Lincoln: University of Nebraska Press.
- Ottoson, Howard (1979). Land and People in the Northern Plains Transition Area. Ayer Publishing.
- Peffer, Louise (1951). The Closing of the Public Domain: Disposal and Reservation Policies, 1900-1950. Stanford University Press.
- Reports of the Department of the Interior for the Fiscal Year Ended June 30, 1916. Washington: Government Printing Office. 1917. p. 157.
- Reynolds, Arthur (1949). "Land Frauds and Illegal Fencing in Western Nebraska". Agricultural History. 23 (3): 173–179. JSTOR 3740079.
- Reynolds, Arthur (1949). "The Kinkaid Act and Its Effects on Western Nebraska". Agricultural History. 23 (1): 20–29. JSTOR 3739379.
- Sandoz, Mari (1935). Old Jules. Lincoln: University of Nebraska Press.
- Starrs, Paul (1998). Let the Cowboy Ride: Cattle Ranching in the American West. Baltimore: Johns Hopkins University Press.
- University of Nebraska (1915). Bulletin of the Agricultural Experiment Station of Nebraska, no. 147. Lincoln: The Station. pp. 11. "kinkaid act."
