= Spade Ranch Store =

Historic general store in Nebraska, US

- U.S. National Register of Historic Places
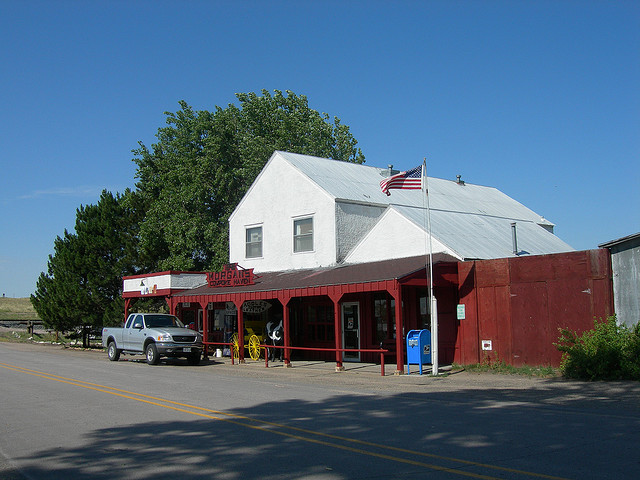

- Location within Nebraska Location within the United States
- Location: W Side of SHWY 27/ Lot 5 of Ellsworth Ellsworth, Nebraska
- Coordinates: 42°3′34.0″N 102°16′52.0″W
- Built: 1898
- NRHP reference No.: 10000629
- Added to NRHP: August 30, 2010

The Spade Ranch Store, currently known as Morgan's Store, is a general store in the hamlet of Ellsworth, Nebraska providing supplies and services to area ranchers and passing motorists. Built in 1898 as a company store as well as the main offices for the expansive Spade Ranch, the store was placed on the National Register of Historic Places in 2010.

== History ==
In the early 1890s, Ellsworth located on the Burlington Railroad line, offered only a depot, school, and section house. In about 1898 the Spade Ranch erected a store, a hotel, and stockyards. The store building, built by W.T. Merrit, served as business office for the ranch, a general supply store and a post office. At the height of the Spade Ranch operations, a 10 horse-team freight wagon made trips from the Ellsworth Store to the Store and Post Office located at the Spade Headquarters 23 miles north east every three days. In 1927 after the foreclosure of the ranch, the store building was sold to Abbott Interest who hired Lawrence Graham to assume its management. Between 1928 and 1950, Lawrence and his wife, Hazel, operated the store, living in the apartment above. During this time, gasoline pumps were added. In 1950, Lawrence and Hazel Graham purchased the store from Abbott Interest. After Lawrence's death in 1960, Hazel and her son, Roy, continued to operate the store until 1967. The store remained vacant from 1967 until 1971, when it was sold to Veldon Morgan, a former Spade Cowboy, and son Wade Morgan who built two large warehouse additions to the original store for use as a western tack and saddle manufacturing plant with over 100 employees. Morgan's western equipment was sold nationwide and achieved much success throughout the 1970s and 1980s. Beginning in the early 1990s Morgan's began to downsize until 2000 when all factory operations ceased because of shifting markets. Today Wade Morgan operates as a ranch supply and general store, serving Ellsworth and the surrounding area.
