= Ellsworth, Nebraska =

Unincorporated community in Sheridan County, Nebraska, United States

- Unincorporated community
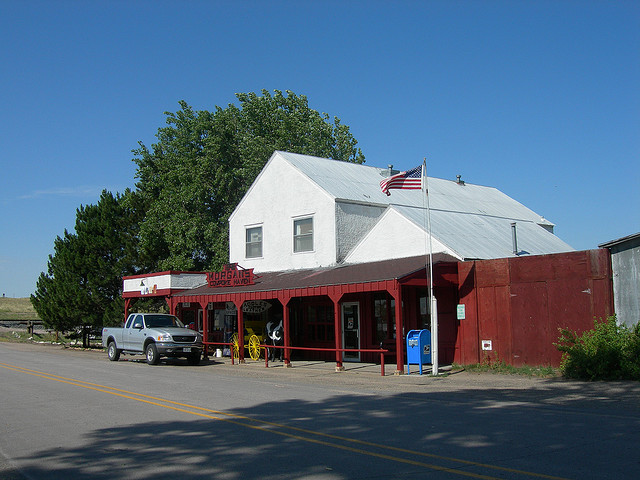
- Morgan's Store and Post Office on Ellsworth's Main Street, summer 2010
- Motto: Home of the Old Spade Ranch
- Location within the state of Nebraska Location within the United States
- Coordinates: 42°3′34.0″N 102°16′49.2″W
- Country: United States
- State: Nebraska
- County: Sheridan

Area
  - Total: 35.6 sq mi (92.3 km^{2})
  - Land: 35.6 sq mi (92.3 km^{2})
  - Water: 0 sq mi (0.0 km^{2})
- Elevation: 1,906 ft (581 m)

Population (2000)
  - Total: 32
  - Density: 9.1/sq mi (3.5/km^{2})
- Time zone: UTC-6 (Mountain (MST))
  - Summer (DST): UTC-5 (MST)
- Postal code: 69340
- Area code: 308
- FIPS code: 31-15185
- GNIS feature ID: 0837985

Ellsworth is an unincorporated community in Sheridan County, Nebraska, United States. As of the 2000 census, the community had a population of 32.

== Description ==
Ellsworth was established in the late nineteenth century as a company town for the Spade Ranch and a shipping point for cattle on the Chicago, Burlington and Quincy Railroad. It was likely named after Ellsworth, Minnesota. Although unincorporated Ellsworth has one business, Morgan's Store and post office with the ZIP code of 69340.

== History ==
In 1888 the Chicago, Burlington and Quincy Railroad chose the site as a location for a depot and water stop on their newly built line. Cattleman Bartlett Richards began assembling the expansive Spade Ranch in the same year, making Ellsworth a company town for the ranch. In 1898, the two-story Spade Ranch Store was built; it supplied freight wagons going north to the Spade Ranch Headquarters. At about the same time, a hotel was built across the street from the store, and a windmill placed in the middle of town. Bartlett Richards had a brick summer home with a courtyard built north of the store location in 1904. The Ellsworth School House, built in 1932, served Ellsworth until 2007.

The Old Spade Ranch Store is the only business currently operating in the village.

== Geography ==
Ellsworth is located at 42°3′37″N 102°16′50″W (42.060322, -102.280606).

== Demographics ==
As of the census of 2000, there were 32 people, 11 households, and 9 families residing in the community. There are 14 housing units. The racial makeup of the village was 96.87% White, and 3.13% from two or more races. Hispanic or Latino of any race were 9.38% of the population.

== Notable person ==
- LeRoy Louden, Nebraska legislator
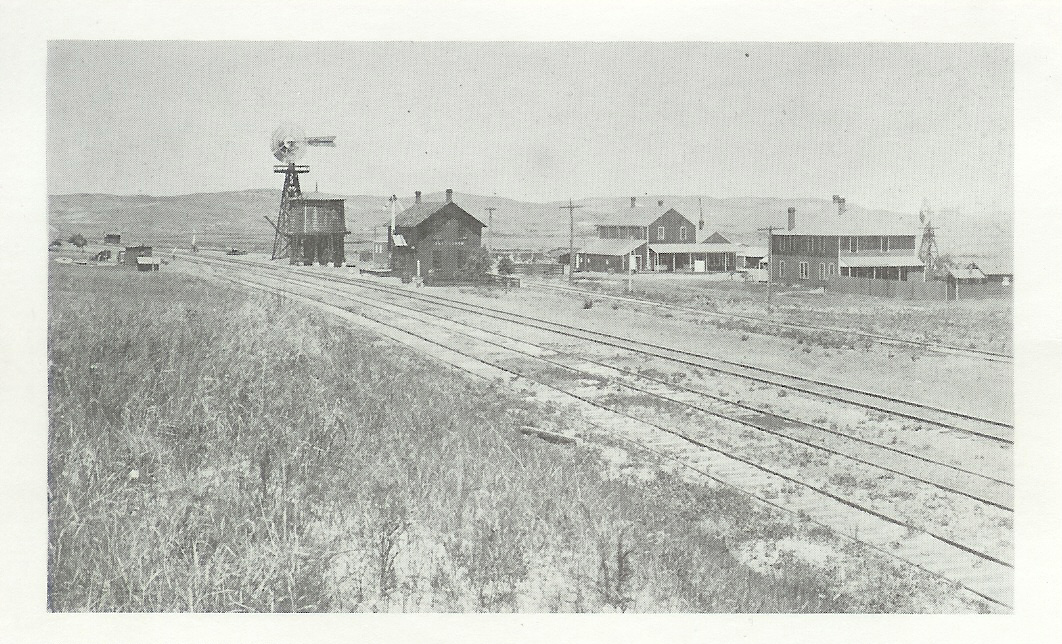
Ellsworth (ca. 1905)

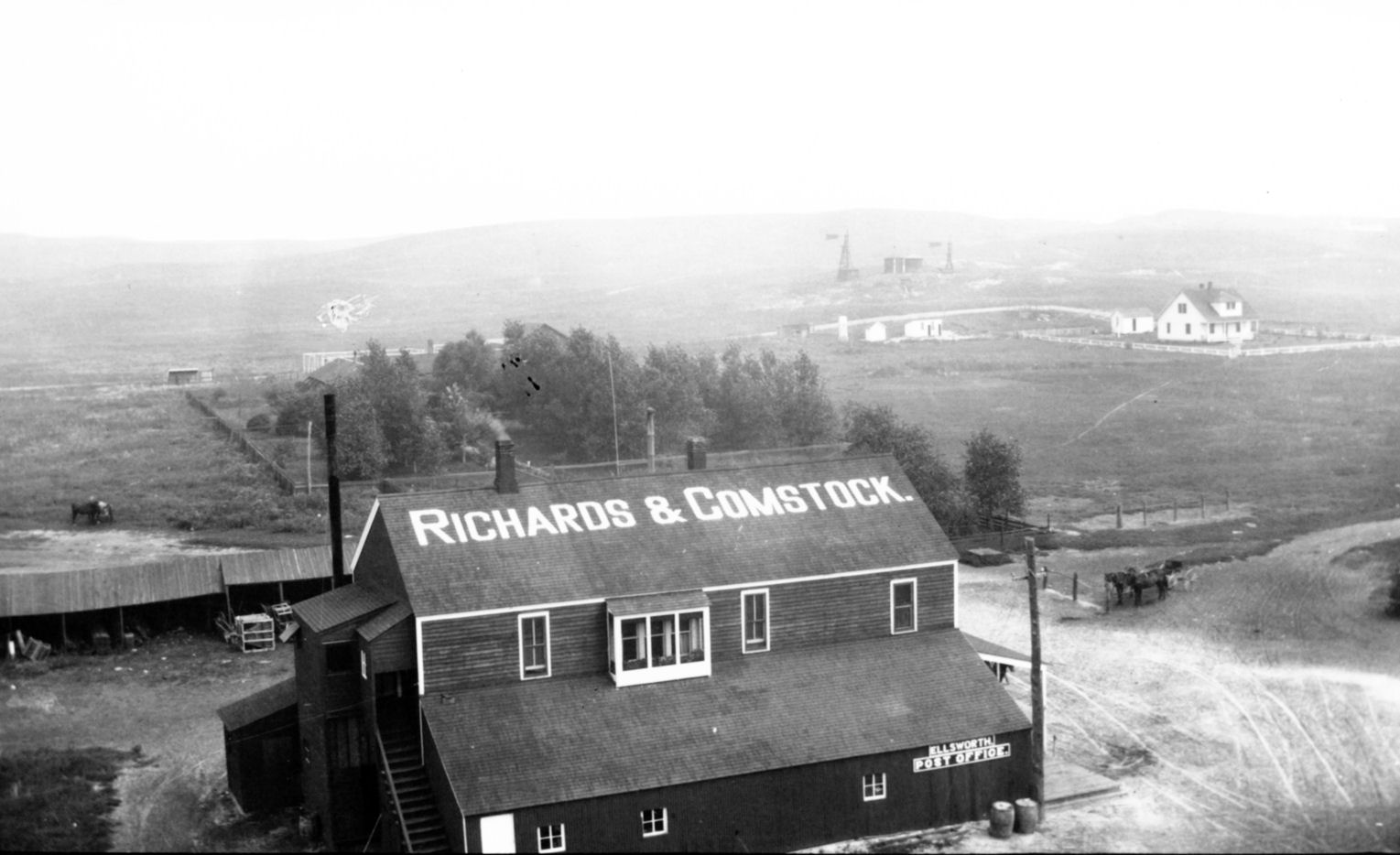
Spade Ranch Store (ca. 1900)

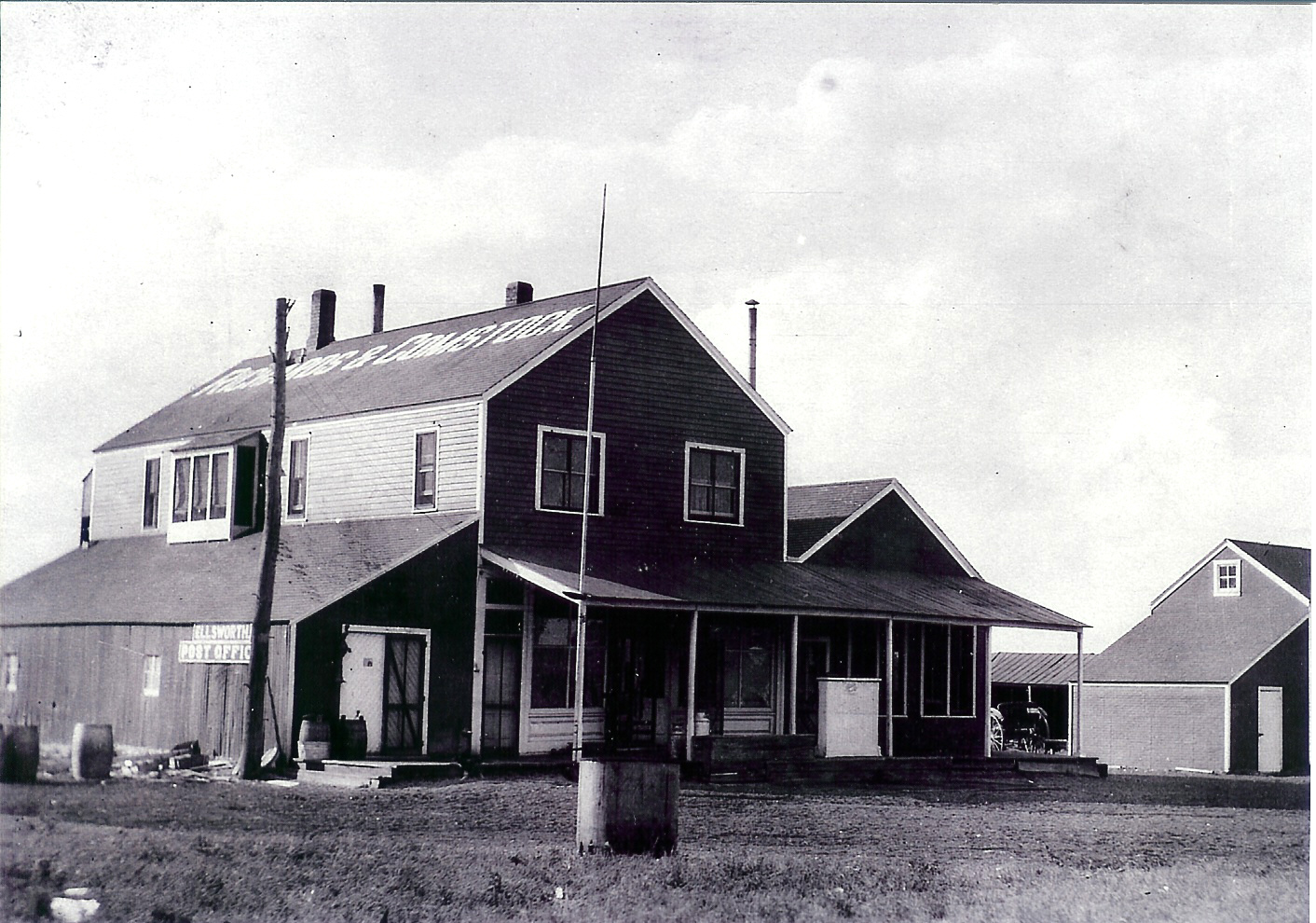
Spade Ranch Store (ca. 1900)

== See also ==
- Spade Ranch
