= Bartlett Richards =

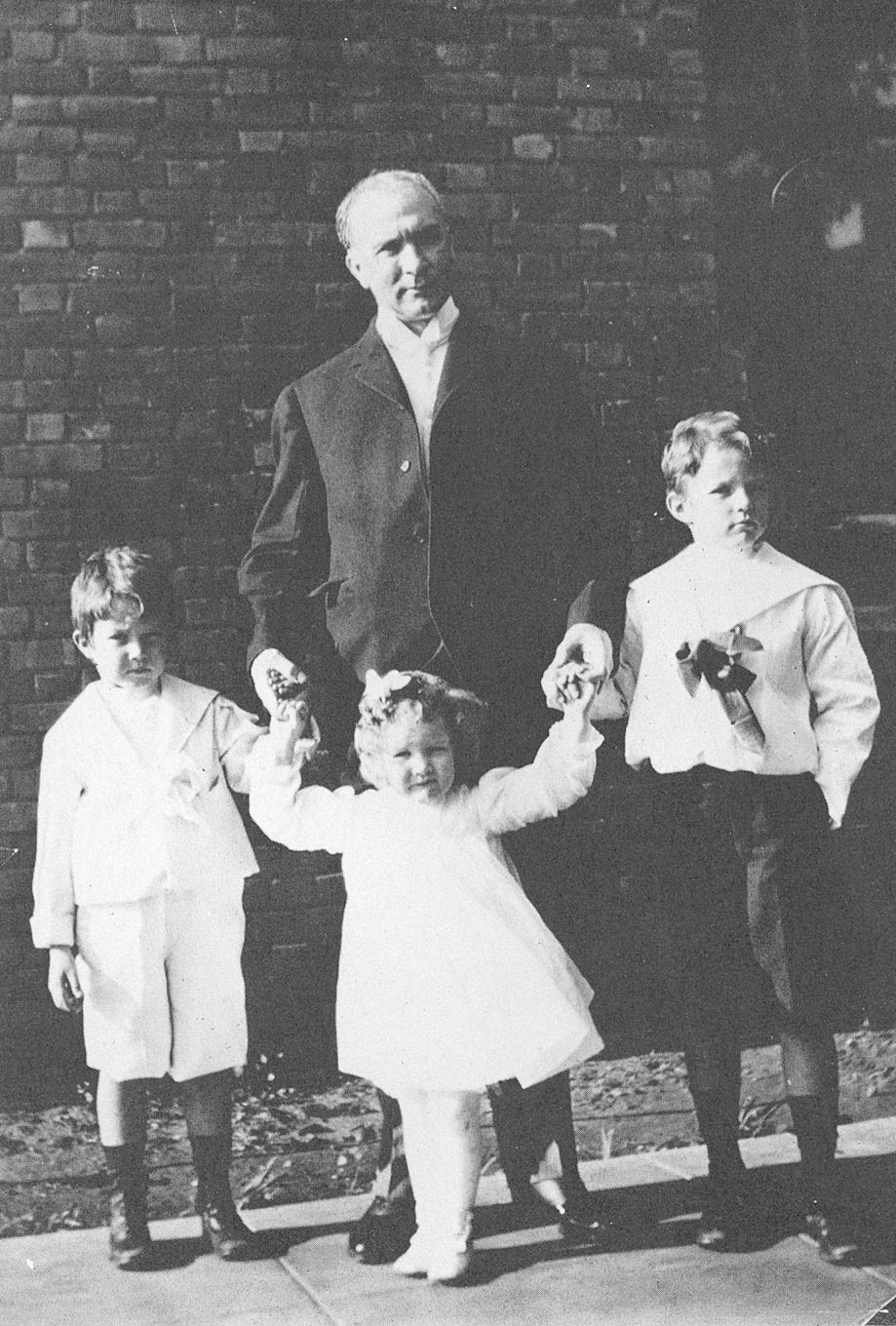
- Richards with his children (ca. 1910)
- Born: Bartlett Richards; January 6, 1862; Weathersfield, Vermont, U.S.
- Died: September 5, 1911 (aged 49); Hastings, Nebraska, U.S.
- Burial place: Vermont
- Education: Phillips Academy
- Occupation: Rancher
- Known for: fencing in vast acreage in Wyoming and Nebraska
- Parents: Rev. J. DeForest Richards (father); Harriet Bartlett Jarvis (mother)

Bartlett Richards (January 6, 1862 – September 5, 1911) was a Cattle Baron and Banker who owned or fenced in vast acreage in Wyoming and Nebraska.

== Early and family life ==
Born on January 6, 1862, in Weathersfield, Vermont, the son of Rev. J. DeForest Richards, a Congregational church pastor and Harriet Bartlett Jarvis. At the age of ten, after his father died, Richards was sent to Phillips Academy in Andover, Massachusetts. After graduation in August 1879, Richards moved west to Cheyenne, Wyoming to recover his health in the outdoors, a prescription similar to that given later-President Theodore Roosevelt. Bartlett Richards, however, became more deeply involved in the cattle business, and elected to remain in Wyoming rather than return to the East. By the time the year was over, he had purchased 1000 head of cattle and established the Ship Wheel Ranch on the Belle Fourche River in northeast Wyoming.

== Career ==
Richards quickly became involved with ranching activities. By 1881, he was managing three ranches in Wyoming and a year later was put in charge of Lakotah and Rocky Mountain Cattle Companies. In 1883, representing Abram Stevens Hewitt, Richards took over the Bronson Ranch (which was renamed the Lower 33) in Sioux County, Nebraska.

In 1885, Richard's elder brother, DeForest Richards, moved west to open a bank in the boomtown of Chadron, Nebraska, which had just been reached by the Fremont, Elkhorn and Missouri Valley Railroad. That year, Congress also passed the Van Wyck fence law, which prohibited fencing the public domain. Bartlett was named vice president of the bank and in 1887 became president of Chadron's First National Bank, in addition to his ranching activities.

Despite the anti-fencing law, the Richards brothers fenced in vast acreage with barbed wire. DeForest Richards controlled about a half million acres and Bartlett Richards had nearly 300 miles of fencing on government lands (in effect securing another half million acres) by 1899. His Nebraska Land and Feeding Co. had fenced in an area equivalent to four times the state of Rhode Island by 1902. Jarvis Richards fenced in Colorado acreage in addition to helping his brothers with their operations. Bartlett Richards noted to fellow cattlemen in February 1902 that over 6 million acres of federal land had been fenced and 350,000 head of cattle were fattening behind those fences, and estimated the land and cattle were worth about $18 million. Richards proposed to legalize these takings by having Congress pass a Lease bill. However, President Theodore Roosevelt (either despite or because of his experience as a cattleman) vetoed it.

He also sent John Mosby to remove the fences. Many of Richard's fences supposedly protected homesteads of soldiers' widows, based on fraudulent documentation. Mosby's Colorado methods failed, however, since the Omaha grand jury refused to authorize an indictment against Richards or anyone but nonresident agent W. R. Lesser. Mosby was recalled to Washington to appease Nebraska's Senators, but other attorneys were sent out, who secured indictments. Richards and his English brother in law William G. Comstock were convicted in 1905 despite their argument that the government land hadn't been surveyed. The local judge sentenced them to $300 fine apiece and six hours in custody, which they spent celebrating at the Omaha Cattlemen's Club, and which led President Roosevelt to fire both the U.S. attorney and U.S. Marshall. The next year Richards and Comstock were indicted on a new charge of conspiracy to deprive the government of public land, convicted and fined $1,500 fines as well as sentenced to a year in jail. After three years of appeals, the convictions and sentences were upheld, they were ordered to serve their sentences at a prison in Hastings, Nebraska, starting in 1911.

Richards was also involved with at least nine other banks in Nebraska and Wyoming, serving as stockholder, vice president, and president. Richards also continued to operate the Lower 33 and Ox Yoke Ranches in Nebraska, including the Spade Ranch empire.

== Death and legacy ==
Richards died in the hospital at Hastings, Nebraska in 1911, a month before his sentence would have been completed. His body was returned to Vermont for burial. The Nebraska Historical Society has microfilm relating to him and his cattle operations. In 1970, he was inducted into the Hall of Great Westerners of the National Cowboy & Western Heritage Museum.

== See also ==
- Spade Ranch (Nebraska)
- Ellsworth, Nebraska
