= Spade Ranch (Nebraska) =

- U.S. National Register of Historic Places
- U.S. Historic district
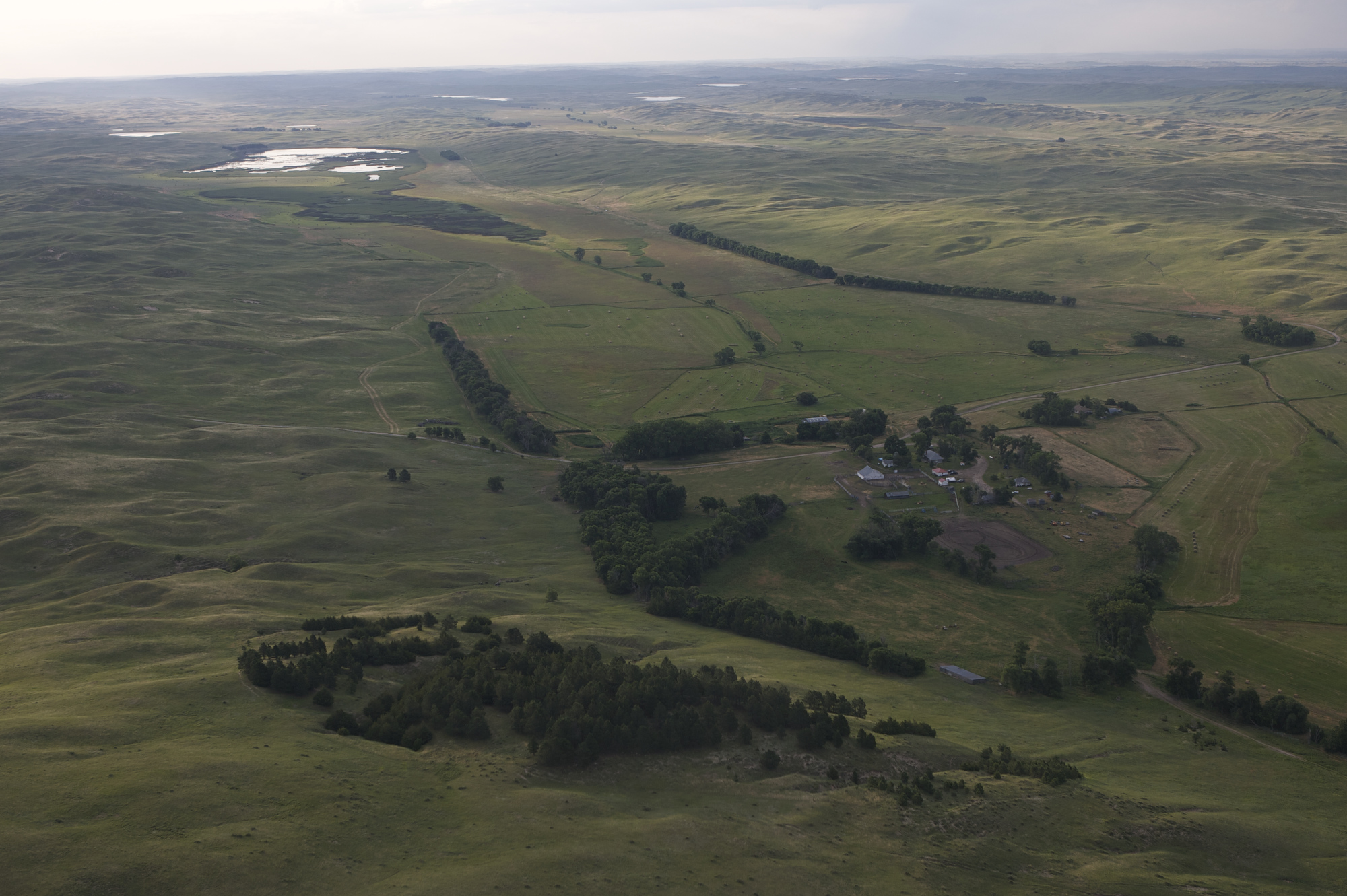
- Spade Ranch Headquarters and Home Valley

- Location within Nebraska Location within the United States
- Location: Sheridan / Cherry counties, Nebraska, USA
- Nearest city: Ellsworth, Nebraska
- Coordinates: 42°18′19.7″N 102°05′25.8″W
- Built: 1888
- NRHP reference No.: 80002464
- Added to NRHP: February 28, 1980

The Spade Ranch is a large cattle ranch located in the Sandhills of western Nebraska between the towns of Gordon and Ellsworth. Established in 1888 by Bartlett Richards, the ranch was placed on the National Register of Historic Places in 1980.

The Spade Ranch, is a historic cattle ranch in the Nebraska Sandhills, spanning portions of Sheridan and Cherry Counties. Established in 1888 by Bartlett Richards and developed in partnership with William G. Comstock and other associates, it became one of the largest ranching enterprises in the United States of America during the late nineteenth and early twentieth centuries. Richards and Comstock played an important role in the development of cattle ranching in Nebraska. Under their management, the Spade grew into a vast and highly organized operation supported by fencing, wells, windmills, trails, and telephone lines, helping demonstrate that the Sandhills could sustain large-scale grazing and improved cattle production. By 1905, with open-range grazing and strong cattle markets, the Spade encompassed more than 500,000 acres (200,000 ha) and, at its peak, supported a herd of 60,000 cattle.

The ranch’s early history was also marked by controversy. In 1906, Richards and Comstock were tried on charges connected to fraudulent public-land entries tied to the ranch’s fenced range. They were convicted, and the legal battles, imprisonment, Richards’s death in 1911, and Comstock’s death in 1916 all contributed to the decline of the original enterprise. By 1923, the ranch’s mortgages had been foreclosed.

The Bixby family became central to the ranch’s later history after the collapse of the original holdings. Lawrence Bixby, whose family had been connected with the ranch since the early 1900s, gradually assembled significant portions of the former Spade lands, including the headquarters in Home Valley and the extensive hay meadows that were among the most valuable parts of the ranch. He restored the property to profitable operation, and the ranch has thereafter remained in Bixby family operation as a working cattle ranch in the Nebraska Sandhills.

The Spade Ranch is named for the cattle brand that founders Bartlett Richards and William Comstock used to mark their cattle. The brand resembles an Ace of Spades on playing cards. The Spade brand is still in use as the ranch brand today.

== History ==
=== Foundation and growth ===
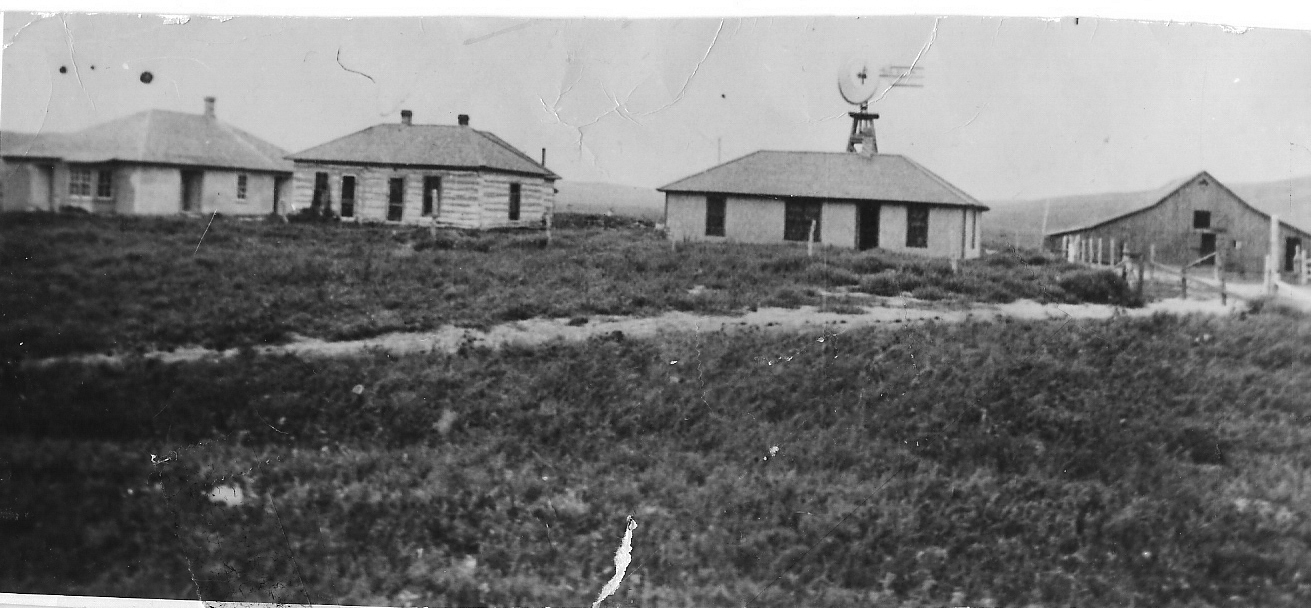
The Spade Ranch headquarters in 1889

Nebraska's early beef cattle industry first developed between the Platte Rivers and along the valleys of the Republican River and South Loup River. H.L. Newman a wealthy St. Louis banker and stock-raiser and brother E.S. Newman established headquarters in 1878 at the mouth of the Antelope Creek, 12 miles (19 km) south-east of the present town of Gordon, Nebraska, and range along the Niobrara River covered an area of 30 by 65 miles (105 km) with 15,000 head of cattle. John Bratt, the Keystone Cattle Company, and the Bosler Brothers had penetrated along the south rim of the Sandhills, but it was not until the spring of 1879 that the economic importance of the Sandhills were discovered. That year storm-driven cattle from the Newman Ranch disappeared South into the Sandhills area previously avoided by cattlemen. An expedition was organized, with ranch foreman Billy Irwin in charge, to venture into the Sandhills and round-up the scattered cattle. During the roundup of those cattle other wild cattle were found; the wild cattle had grown fat even though untended during several winters. On the fourth week out and running low on provisions, the Newman cowboys camped along a lake where all they had to eat was bean soup. They called the lake Bean Soup Lake, four miles (6 km) east of what would later become the headquarters of the Spade Ranch. One of the Newman cowboys on the 1879 round-up, was later Omaha mayor James Dahlman.

Word of the Newman Ranch's successful roundup of 1879 spread and rangeland along the Niobrara filled as fast as cattlemen could move in stock and erect shacks and corrals, but no ranch headquarters had as yet located within the Sandhills themselves. Bennett Irwin, one of the cattlemen on the 1879 roundup into the Sandhills, had as early as 1884 began to file on land in a large valley to the west of Bean Soup Lake called the Home Valley. The Home Valley is at the beginning of a series of large valleys capable of producing many thousands of tons of hay, making it an ideal location for settlement and development of a ranch.

On August 10, 1888, Bartlett Richards bought Bennett Irwin's filing near Bean Soup Lake in Sheridan County. The Log House from the Newman Ranch was disassembled and moved to its new location in the Home Valley, making it the first building erected at the newly formed Spade Ranch. During the 1890s, Richards developed his almost 800 square miles (2,100 km^{2}) in Sheridan and Cherry Counties into manageable units. Ranching activities occurred year round. Following the breeding schedule, spring was calving and round up. Summer activities included harvesting hay to use for cattle feed in the fall and winter. Additional laborers were often hired to help with this task. During the fall fireguards were plowed to prevent fires from spreading, as the pastures had dried by the summer and cattle were shipped by railroad to markets in Omaha and Chicago. Year round activities included providing beef for the Indian agencies and building fences. Initially, fences created corrals at the ranch headquarters. By the early 1890s, fencing of grazing areas increased. The number of widespread roundups in the area may have increased the desire to fence in areas.

The Spade Ranch was one of the larger operations near the Pine Ridge Agency and supplied beef to the Dakota reservation. The Chadron Advocate reported in 1891," Bartlett Richards has received the beef contract at Pine Ridge Agency for the ensuing year. The amount is 6,000,000 pounds. This will require 6,000 head of cattle." The Spade continued a contract with the Pine Ridge Agency until 1896. Even though the agency provided good business, most of the steady business came from shipping cattle to packers or feeders in the corn belt.

In December 1895, the Richard and Cairnes partnership was formed with assets totaling $475,000.00 ( $12,087,227.00 current). Richards and Cairnes, Inc., included Richards as president, John Cairnes of Boston as vice president, and Jarvis Richards, secretary and treasurer. John Cairnes only attended one board meeting and in 1899 sold his stock to Richards and resigned. William Comstock took Cairnes' place on the board, and they remained partners until Richards' death in 1911.

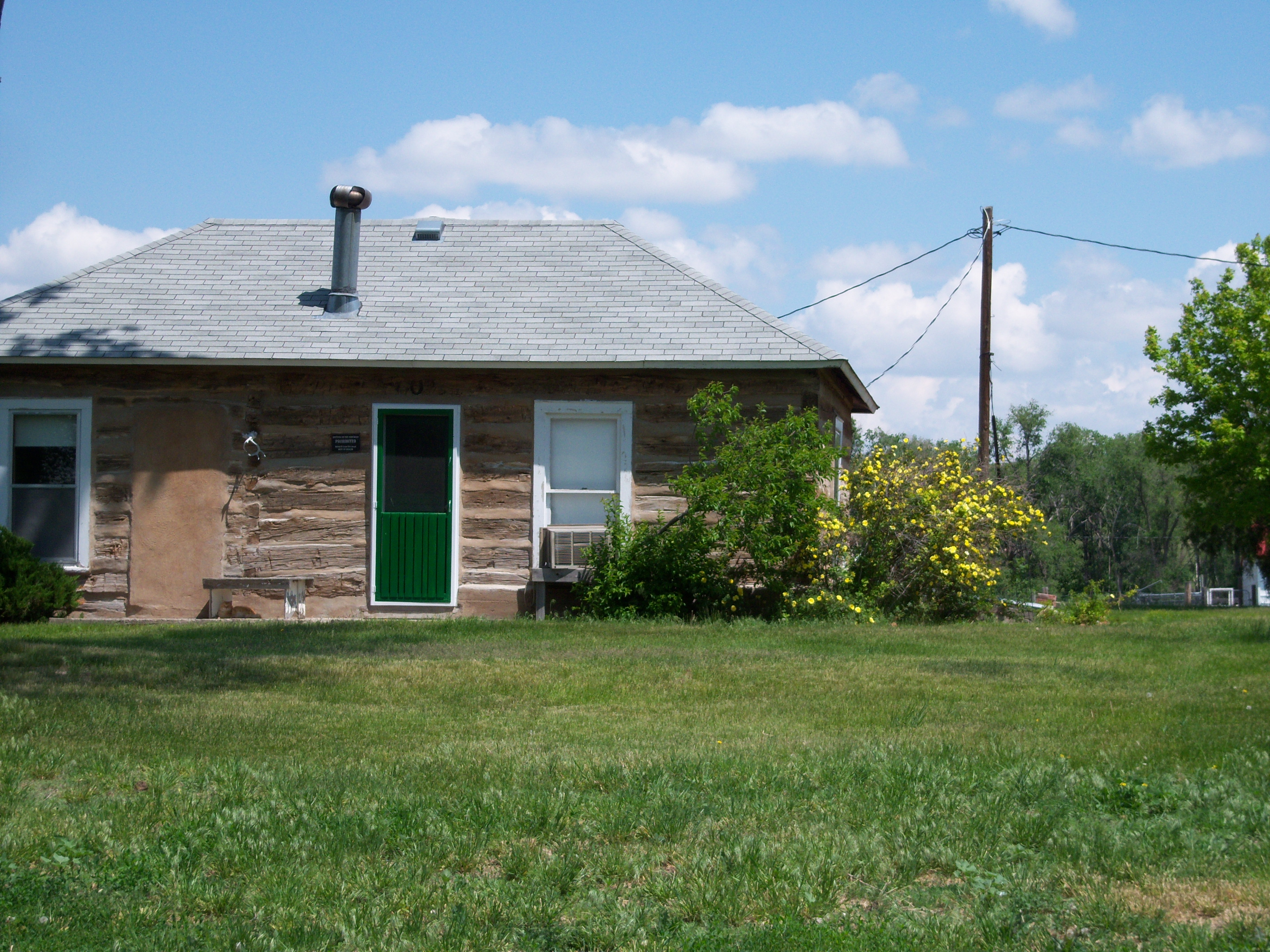
Log Cookhouse on Spade Ranch built in 1877

As early as the 1880s, Richards established the Spade Ranch's cattle shipping point in Ellsworth, southwest of the Spade Ranch. In 1898, Richards and Cairnes, Inc., built a store, hotel, and stockyards in the small community. The store served as office headquarters for the Spade Ranch and included a general store and post office. The hotel built across the street from the store, provided free accommodations for the Spade Ranch cowboys.

In May 1899, the two companies (Richards and Cairnes, Inc., and Richards and Comstock) merged to form the Nebraska Land and Feeding Company. Bartlett Richards, William Comstock, Jarvis Richards, DeForest Richards, and E.C. Harris of Chadron were named directors. At the time of the merger, the company range included 16,000 head of cattle. Bankers authorized loans of $150,000.00 ($3,817,019.11 current) to purchase additional cattle.

William Comstock stayed in the home valley of the Spade Ranch headquarters, which is approximately 25 miles (40 km) north of Ellsworth. Comstock had a sod house at the headquarters, another soddie as a ranch office, a good-sized bunkhouse, the log cookhouse (the log building moved from the Newman Ranch), a barn, feed yards, large corrals for working with cattle, breaking horses, branding, and dipping cattle, a blacksmith shop, a machine shop and the ranch store. The ranch store featured staple groceries, clothing, supplies, and a place to pick up mail carried from the Ellsworth post office. Later Comstock built a large frame house in the center of Spade operations. One additional house was built as a home for Spade foreman, Mike Peterson. Peterson worked for the Spade for several years, but rather than work for a wage, he received both land and stock.

By January 1899, telephone lines were constructed from Gordon to Ellsworth, and lines were proposed to extend to Rushville, Hay Springs, and Chadron under the new "Ranch Telephone Company". The Ranch Telephone Company was incorporated with Richards as president. Telephone lines connected the cattle-shipping points on the Burlington Railroad—Ellsworth, Lakeside, and Bingham—with Comstock's headquarters at the ranch.

Richards moved his headquarters from Chadron to Ellsworth in 1901 to be closer to the ranch. He completed his brick house in Ellsworth in the summer of 1902. The Richards family had a winter residence built in Coronado, California, that same year.

Richards began to concentrate on upgrading the breeding operation. He experimented with grain feeds to take care of calves and other special feeding problems, and he put in windmills for adequate water. Richards and Comstock were the first cattlemen in the area to use chloro-naptholeum, a livestock dip that removed lice, mange, Texas itch, and other external parasites. The Spade Ranch was the agent for this patented product west of the Mississippi River. In 1903, the Spade's Hereford cattle won the Grand Prize at the American Royal Stock Show in Kansas City, Missouri, for the best of any breed in both yearling and calf competition.

==== War widow claims ====
In 1901, Richards had 400 sections of land surveyed north of Ellsworth and placed a four-wire fence around the 250,000 acres (100,000 ha). This area included government-owned land with 30 reservoirs, each of which had two or three windmills and water tanks for the stock. The fencing of pastures was necessary to prevent scattering of cattle and preserve breeding. To protect grazing lands from settlers, some ranches, such as the Spade, filed 160-acre (65 ha) homesteads where they had built fences. For example, the Spade Ranch paid Civil War veterans, their widows, and others to make the land claims and then transfer the leases to the ranch. This method allowed ranches to protect ranges and buy time in hope that a leasing law would be passed. The first batch of Civil War widows filed for the Spade Ranch in July 1902 and, within a month, enough widow claims had been added to cover the western side of Richard's southern pasture.

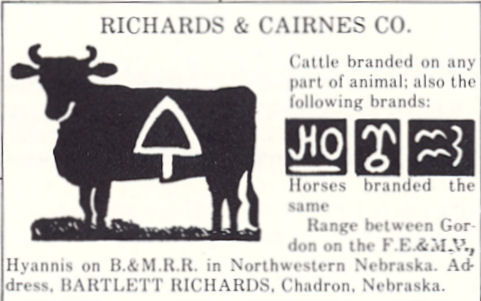
Spade Brand

1903 Kansas City American Royal Stock Show Grand Prize Cudahy Cup Awarded to the Spade Ranch

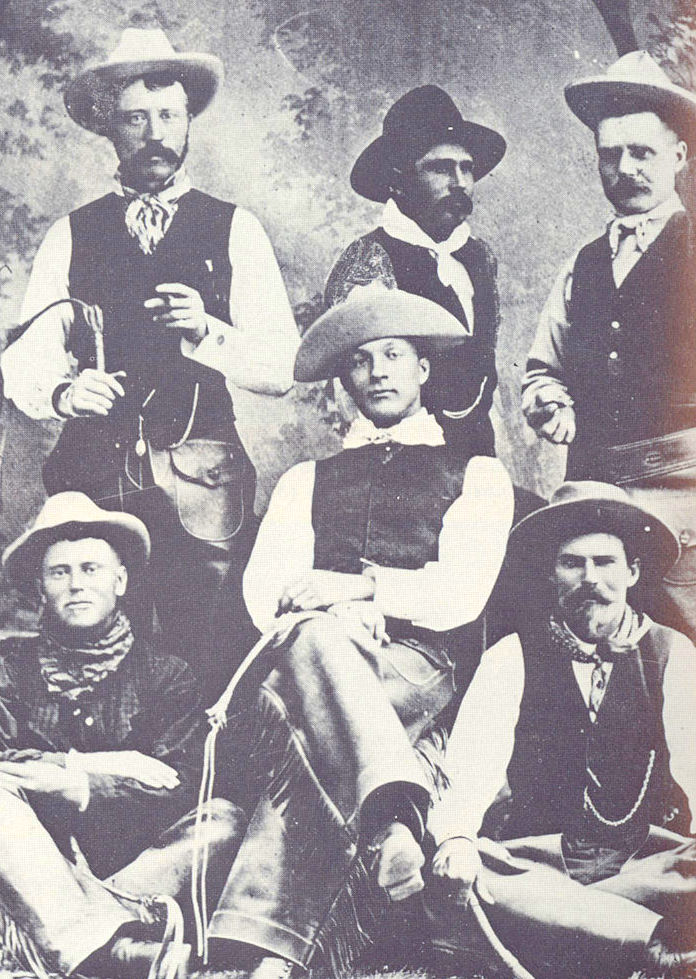
Bartlett Richards (center) age 20

=== Fencing controversy and trials ===
In general, cattlemen did not feel that fencing was wrong. They believed they were fencing land unsuitable for any other uses, especially farming. Further, they believed a method of leasing land was a way to give value to the government land in the Sandhills and allow fencing to be legal. The House Committee on Public Lands held hearings on leasing and grazing legislation between January and June 1902.

Richards testified in favor of the Bowersock Bill, making the following plea:

Here the United States has immense properties that are not improving, which we [cattlemen] have grown up with and have improved, and we ask you that while you have no better use for this land, that you will lease it to us at a reasonable rental, and that the moment you have any better use for it, for irrigation, for mineral entires, for storage reservoirs, for agricultural purposes, for forest reserves, for anything else which may come up and be the sense of Congress that it wants, that land shall be lifted out of the lease, and no recompense shall be made to the former leaseholder.

— Hearings before the Committee on Public Lands, 1902

Congress hesitated to pass a leasing act, and the United States Department of the Interior was determined to remove the fences. By November 1902, the Rushville Standard reported that Bartlett Richards had been ordered to remove his fences in Sheridan and Cherry Counties. The fenced enclosed about 60 civil townships, which would be enough to support 960 families at two sections per family. The Secretary of the Interior, Ethan A. Hitchcock, following the Roosevelt administration's direction, set out to enforce the 1885 Van Wyck Law, which forbade the fencing of public lands.

In 1905, Richards and Comstock were indicted and brought to trial for the illegal fencing of 212,000 acres (86,000 ha) of government land. They first entered a plea of not guilty, but quickly reconsidered and plead guilty to "asserting ownership and exclusive occupancy of government lands". Attorney Richard S. Hall told the court as the plea was entered for his clients:"It is our intention to comply with the law. We are removing the fences as rapidly as we can, but such as may remain, we have nothing to do with. Wherever the government shows us we have an unlawful fence, we will remove it." The fences they had "nothing to do with" may refer to those on a common boundary with other ranches or on widow claims.

On November 13, 1905, Richards and Comstock were sentenced to the custody of a United States Marshal for six hours and a fine of $300 and half of court costs. The modest sentence may have reflected a finding that they did not intimidate settlers and that their employees were at work removing the fences. Controversially, newspaper accounts charged that Richards and Comstock took part in a victory celebration instead of serving time. The Secretary of the Interior was upset about the news and fired District Attorney Baxter and Marshal Thomas L. Mathews, the officer in charge of Richards and Comstock's six-hour sentence. In reality, during their sentence, Richards and Comstock returned to the hotel to pack, write letters, shop, eat dinner, and arrive at the train station for the 11 p.m. train to Ellsworth.

In August 1906, new changes were brought against all Spade officials for "conspiracy to defraud the government of the title and use of public lands, subornation of perjury, and conspiracy to suborn perjury". The case was called to trial on November 12, 1906, in the Federal District Court in Omaha before Judge William H. Munger. Richards and Comstock did not testify. United States Secret Service men spent 13 months investigating and getting evidence. Affidavits were taken from 600 witnesses, subpoenas were issued for 165 witnesses, and 132 people offered evidence in trail.

On December 20, 1906, the jury delivered a guilty verdict on 35 of the 38 counts. A motion for a new trial was overruled and the sentence to Bartlett Richards and William Comstock was $1,500 fines and eight months in prison. Richards and Comstock appealed the verdict and were released on a $5,000 bond. The appellate court affirmed the guilty verdict on December 3, 1909. On October 17, 1910, the Supreme Court declined to hear the appeals of Richards, Comstock, and their associates, and ordered them to pay the fines and prepare to serve their sentences beginning on December 7.

Comstock, Jameson, and Triplett surrendered in late November and Richards arrived in Omaha on December 7, 1910. All four were transferred to the Adams County jail in Hastings to serve their sentences. Again the press covered the story of their imprisonment with false accounts. It was reported that Richards and Comstock were receiving special treatment but, in reality, the two were in the same surroundings as other prisoners and were granted very few privileges.

In June 1911 Richards was allowed to go to the Mayo Clinic in Rochester, Minnesota, for gallstone surgery and returning to the Hastings jail on August 10. Richards had long-standing intestinal troubles and never fully recovered from surgery. Bartlett Richards died while incarcerated at Hastings, Nebraska, in the early morning hours of September 4, 1911, before his wife could arrive by train from the family home in Coronado, California. When Will Comstock first heard the news of the partner's death, he is reported to have said, "May the angels guide you into Paradise, and may the martyrs come to meet you." The next day William Comstock was released and his sentence commuted by order of President William Taft so as to attend the funeral of his business partner in San Diego.

The trials and appeals had caused financial strain on the ranch and holdings of the Nebraska Land Company. Before his imprisonment, Richards had been ill and no longer directly managed the ranch. During his imprisonment, there was no direct supervision of the ranch affairs. Following Richards' death, Comstock took control of the Spade Ranch and the Comstock and Richards families shared quarters at the Ellsworth house in the summers. In 1912, Comstock closed the C Bar and Overton Ranches, reducing the official land holding of the Spade Ranch. William Comstock died of cancer in the fall of 1916. Despite Comstock's advice to the contrary, Mrs. Richards kept control of the ranch.

It was difficult to maintain the ranch, because the era of free range was over. By 1916, Kinkaiders had claimed the land in the middle of the Spade range. Range land, once free, now had to be leased or bought from the homesteaders. The Nebraska Land and Feeding Company borrowed $200,000 ($3,893,991.77 current) from the New York Trust Company through a first mortgage on the Spade Land. The ranch survived until the depression of 1922-1923, during which time the mortgages on the land were foreclosed. By this time, the holdings of the Spade Ranch had been reduced to about 60,000 acres (24,000 ha). The Richards family spent their last summer in Ellsworth in 1923 and the ranch was turned over to the bank.

=== Reviving the Spade – the Bixby acquisition ===
With the New York Trust Company's takeover of the Spade Ranch following the Nebraska Land and Feeding Company's foreclosure the future of the Spade was in question. In late 1923 Edward M. Brass, and his business partner, Edward P. Meyers, both prominent cattlemen, business men and owners of the Sandhill Cattle Company secured the lease on the Spade Ranch. Brass and Meyers seemed to have uncanny foresight of economic change. Prior to 1922 they had sold most of their cattle at good prices and then leased their ranches out then with cattle prices low in 1923-24, they bought back into the cattle business. Beginning in 1924 management of the ranch was given to Lawrence Y. Bixby, cattleman and former employee of the Nebraska Land and Feeding Company.

Lawrence had first arrived at the Spade Ranch in 1909 at the age of thirteen and grew up observing and working for its owners. In 1908 his father James Bixby, an eastern professor, bought a homestead relinquishment four miles East of the Spade Ranch headquarters next to Bean Soup Lake after James had taken a teaching position for Bartlett Richards and William Comstock. On March 3, 1909, the rest of the family arrived at the rail siding in Ellsworth. As they freighted past the Spade Ranch Store with milk cow trailing, the Spade Foreman Mike Peterson saw them from the front porch and laughed when he saw the family's piano in the wagon and said “I’ll just give them nesters six months.” Lawrence would later write, “Before the Petersons left a few years later, Mike sold me his homestead for $11 dollars an acre.” They chose the tranquil name of Cloverleaf Ranch for their new homestead but in the first year a rattlesnake bit their dog, James killed a wolf and a neighbor threatened to contest Lawrence's sister Ina's homestead filing unless they gave him a cow, calf and a spool of wire. A two-room sod house was to be their home until 1914 when they hauled $427.00 in lumber from Bingham for a frame house. The Spade Ranch was post office, store, branding-dipping area, and business channel for the Bixby's, as well as their new neighbors. His mother Jennie was offered a job cooking for the ranch. “The Spade always had cook trouble, they’d ship in a cook from Denver and the cook would line up all the extracts he could get and drink it all”, Lawrence wrote, “They would come down to the homestead and get mother to cook. I used to go up and help her at the cookhouse. I rode Old Plunger and had an eleven dollar Sears Roebuck saddle”. Lawrence's first job for the Spade was operating an 8-foot Sulkey rake during Haying. In 1909 Bartlett Richards bought 20,000 head of cattle delivered from Mexico. “That November it just didn’t stop snowing. The Spade lost 10,000 head of those cattle. There was a pile of hides in Ellsworth as big as the depot. My brother Onie and I skinned cows all winter for 50 cents a cow, 25 cents per calf. We tried to skin the dead cattle before they froze’, Lawrence wrote, “so we’d chain a dead cows horns to a post, slit the skin around her ears so we could fasten a chain there, hook our old horse Dan to that chain and peel off the hide.” During the sub-zero weather as many as 30 Mexican cows a night might die in the rushes of the East Spade Home Valley alone. One afternoon Bartlett Richards yellow buggy approached, “He got out of his cart,” Lawrence wrote, “helped us turn the cow on her back, and said, ‘Hurry up, you kids. Get that hide off and get home before you freeze!’”. Lawrence attended rural schools until 1911 when he went to stay in Lincoln with his father’s cousin, Dr. Ammi L. Bixby. In 1913 Lawrence was Lincoln High Schools best runner of a mile. When Lawrence was old enough to file on a homestead of his own he described his land on the Alkali Meadow as a quarter mile deep and two miles wide but he met requirements and received patent on the string of 40’s.

Lawrence’s father James died in 1918 and his mother Jennie along with Lawrence operated their land and cattle for a time as Mrs. J.H. Bixby and Sons. Bartlett Richards had died in 1911 and Will Comstock in 1916. Although Comstock had advised Mrs. Richards and her sons Bartlett Jr. and Longley to sell the Spade before his death the Richards Family remained on the ranch, which by 1920 had dwindled to about 60,000 acres, far from its height of 500,000 acres in 1900. In 1922 with cattle prices crashing Mrs. Richards was forced to abdicate when the mortgages were foreclosed. In 1924 Edward Brass and E.P. Meyers, operating as the Sandhills Cattle Company, branding the Sugar Bowl brand, leased the Spade along with their Triangle, Sillasen, Joy, Carver and Big Creek Ranches. They had sold most of their cattle beforehand at good prices then with livestock prices at a low in 1923–24 they bought back in but lacked hay and range. Lawrence was hired to put up the hay on the Spade, feeding 10,000 tons for .75 cents per ton that first year. When a buyer loaded them with 14,000 head of Texas yearlings, Brass depended on Lawrence to find the necessary rangeland. On May 23, 1927 Lawrence married Miss Eleanor Riordan of York, Ne. Eleanor had begun teaching Cherry County Dist. 168 the previous year. Lawrence wrote, “I married her the day school was out. I would have earlier but she was making $40 dollars a month and I wanted to be sure she had it all.” Through their union Lawrence and Eleanor bore two sons Larry Leonard in 1928 and James Daniel in 1929. Slowly with Brass's help, hard work and willing bankers, Lawrence was able to obtain some the most desirable old Spade range. “When I got a chance to buy into the Spade land, Brass loaned me the money,” he said, “Eleanor cooked for the hay crews and everyone on the place worked hard.” In 1937 after E.P. Meyer's death the Sandhills Cattle Company deal was dissolved. In the late 1930s Lawrence established himself by setting up a little better than average salary scale and obtained the best ranch cooks around. He seldom fired anyone and selected his help carefully. A man had to be able to handle draft horse teams, cable hay, pitch multiple stacks a day, chop ice on a twenty five foot tank and scatter up to a ton of cake. In 1947 Lawrence purchased the Spade's first airplane, a Piper J-3 Cub, but found the plane to small and gave it to his boys. Lawrence then, at the age of 52, purchased a Stinson 108-3 Flying Station Wagon of which he estimated himself to have flown over 100,000 miles on routine ranch duties. Aircraft proved to be vital during the ‘49 Blizzard and for daily life on secluded Sandhill ranches. In 1950 he estimated that 25 percent of Sandhills ranchers owned or made use of ranch airplanes. Lawrence served on the executive board of the Nebraska Stock Growers Association, Nebraska Beef Council, the Highway 27 Association, Sheridan County Draft Board and in 1954 was elected President of the Nebraska Flying Farmers and Ranchers Association. Lawrence hosted fly-ins, rodeos, bbq’s, ballgames, and dances through the years and believed that a handshake answered better than words. Lawrence always admired Bartlett Richards as a cattleman. “Not many people appreciated Bartlett Richards vision, and how well informed and capable the man was. If he had lived, it’s had to imagine what he might have accomplished. The homesteaders would have starved to death without Richards," he said. " He loaned them milk cows, gave them horses and let them charge at the Spade Ranch Store. Even after the Kinkaid Act people couldn't exist by trying to farm or raise cattle on 640 acres (260 ha). They left and Richards bought their land at fair prices. Through Lawrence's efforts, including compiling a petition of 300 cattleman's signatures, in 1970 Bartlett Richards was inducted into the National Cowboy Hall of Fame in Oklahoma City, Ok. In 1980 Lawrence received news that six sections of the Spade Home Valley and numerous original buildings at the headquarters had been listed on the National Register of Historic Places. This included the 1879 log cookhouse (moved from the Newman Ranch in 1888), 1889 horse barn and the 1889 Richards-Comstock House originally constructed of sod. In that same year Bixby himself was named a patron member of the National Cowboy Hall of Fame and his photograph was etched on a silver plaque in the Founders Hall section.

During his ownership, Bixby planted thousands of trees in the home valley around the Spade Ranch and installed airstrips for the ranch airplanes. In addition to reviving the Spade Ranch, Lawrence Bixby also returned the Richards Home in Ellsworth, Nebraska to noteworthy status. Since the time of the Richards ownership, the house had been divided into apartments and was in disrepair. In 1953–1954, Lawrence and wife Eleanor moved to the Ellsworth house after it was rehabilitated. In 1965 the ranch headquarters included the large 1889 Comstock-Bixby house where Lawrence's son Jim and family lived, another residence built in 1952 for Lawrence's other son Larry and family, three large bunkhouses, the 1879 log cookhouse, large 1889 horse barn, cattle dipping vat, livestock scales, feed yards, large corrals for working with cattle and breaking horses, calving barns, 1895 blacksmith shop, cattle feed storage facilities, a machine shop and a large three-aircraft hangar. In 1954, Bixby donated $60,000 ($552,863.20 current USD) to help pave Nebraska Highway 27 from Ellsworth to Gordon, which passed by the ranch.

State Historical Preservation Officer Marvin F. Kivett explained:

The Spade Ranch is significant to the agricultural history and settlement of the Great Plains region of the United States. The original owners of the ranch, Bartlett Richards and William Comstock, were among the few who proved the Nebraska's Sandhills if handled properly, made good grazing land. Because of the ranch's notoriety during the fencing and land conspiracy trials of the early 20th century, the Spade Ranch has become a legend in the history of cattle ranching in the Great Plains. The ranch is owned and operated by Lawrence Bixby and sons Larry and James of Ellsworth.

— State Historical Preservation Officer Marvin F. Kivett

Lawrence Bixby died of heart failure May 26, 1982, an Alliance Times Herald headline read:

Lawrence Y. Bixby, 86, a prominent rancher in the Ellsworth area for almost 70 years, died Friday morning at Box Butte General Hospital. Mr. Bixby was born October 21, 1895 in Maywood, Nebraska and moved to the ranch with his family in 1909. In the fall of 1909 he went to work for the Spade Ranch and at the age of 14 he raked hay with an 8-foot (2.4 m) hand-dump sulkey rake pulled by a team of horses. In 1909 and part of 1910, Bartlett Richards, Sr. was frequently at the ranch. Richards' federal conviction was still under appeal and his partner, Comstock, had not yet begun to serve their sentences. Mr. Bixby took over the ranch in the early 1930s and now he, his sons and grandsons operate approximately 40 square miles of old Spade range. At the time the family moved to the Spade Ranch his mother was cook and his father taught the Spade school. He was a member of the Nebraska Stock Growers, the National Cattlemen's Association, the Alliance Elks Clubs and the Old Time Cowboys Association. Mr. Bixby married the former Eleanor Riordan on May 23, 1927 in Alliance and she survives at the home in Ellsworth. The Couple moved to Ellsworth about 28 years ago. He was active in Alliance and other rodeos during the years. In addition to his widow, he is survived by two sons Larry and James both of Ellsworth; and by 10 grandchildren and 14 great grandchildren.

— Alliance Times Herald Headlines, 1982

Following Lawrence Bixby's death in 1982 ranch operations were passed to son James D. Bixby. Jim who had won notoriety in the Professional Rodeo Cowboys Association Calf Roping circuit retained a very large quarterhorse remuda and maintained the Spade's tradition of using only horse and cowboy for daily ranch operations. During his ownership Bixby transitioned the cow herd from Hereford to Angus Cattle due to changing market demands. Jim was very active on and off the ranch until his death from cancer in 1990. The Spade has been owned by Jim's son Bret Y. Bixby, a Professional Rodeo Cowboys Association Steer Roper, and wife Colleen Bixby since 1990.

Checking Spade Cattle by ranch aircraft (ca.2009)

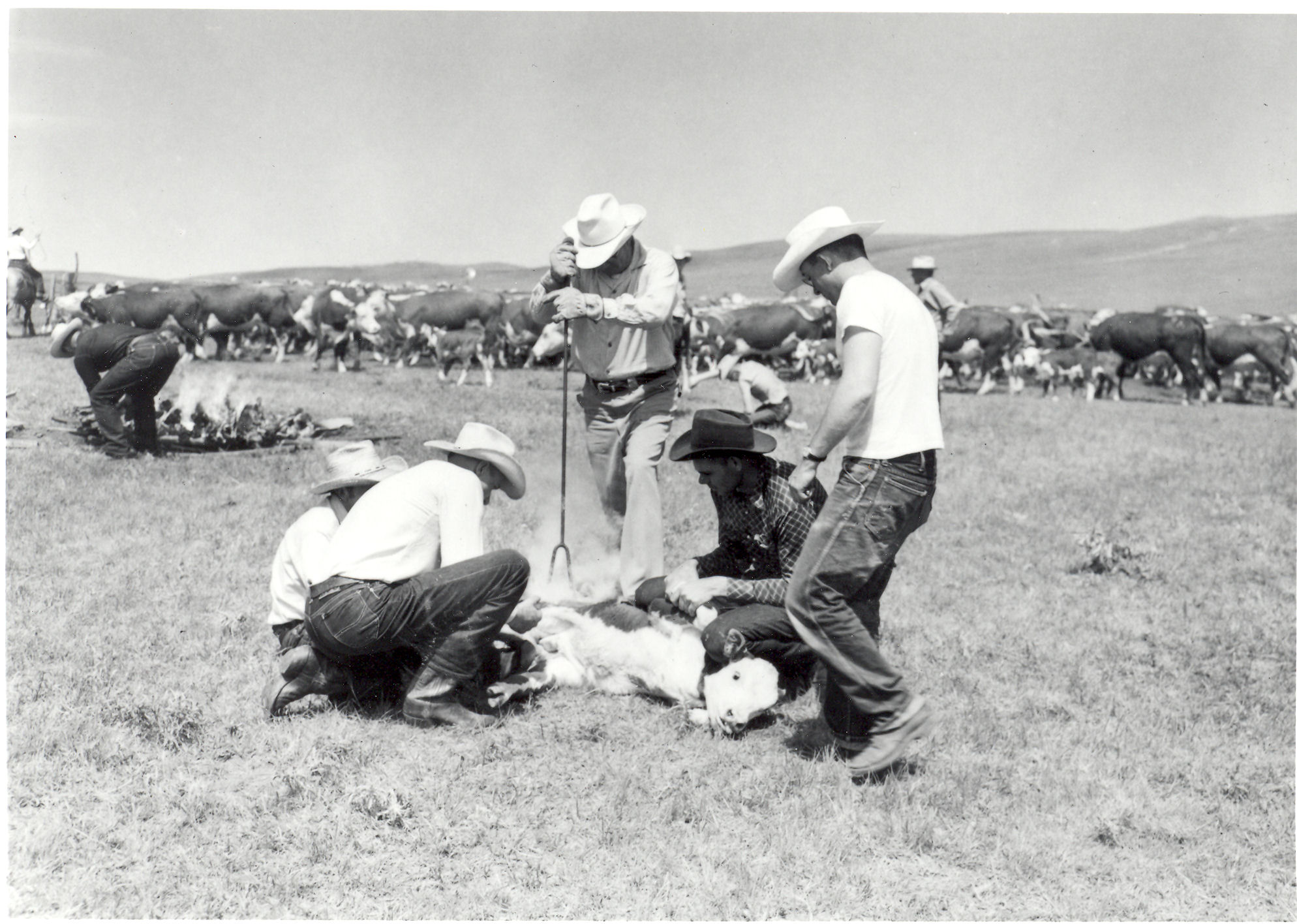
Branding at Spade Ranch (c. 1963)

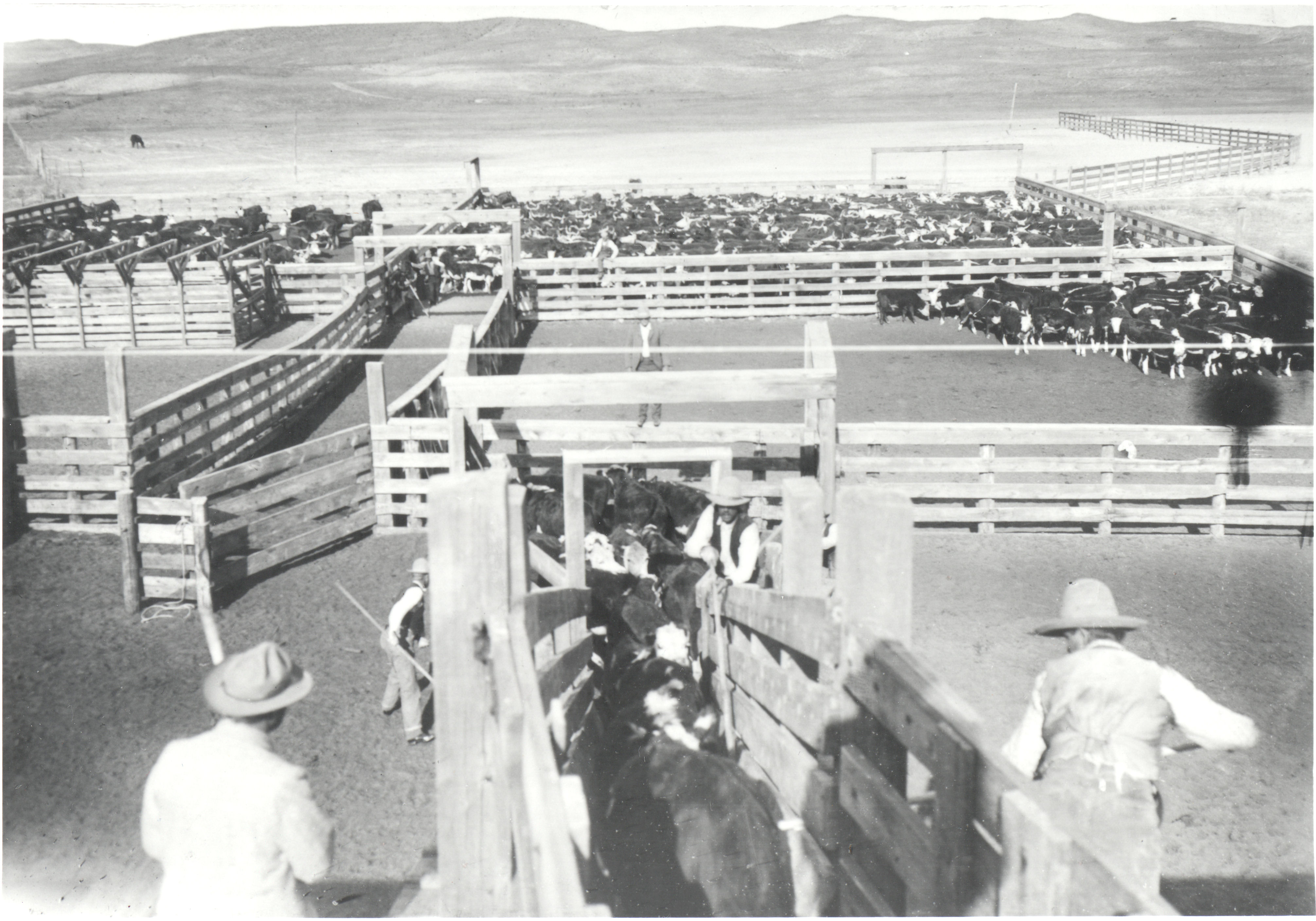
Loading Spade cattle on rail at Ellsworth Stockyards. (William Comstock on left)

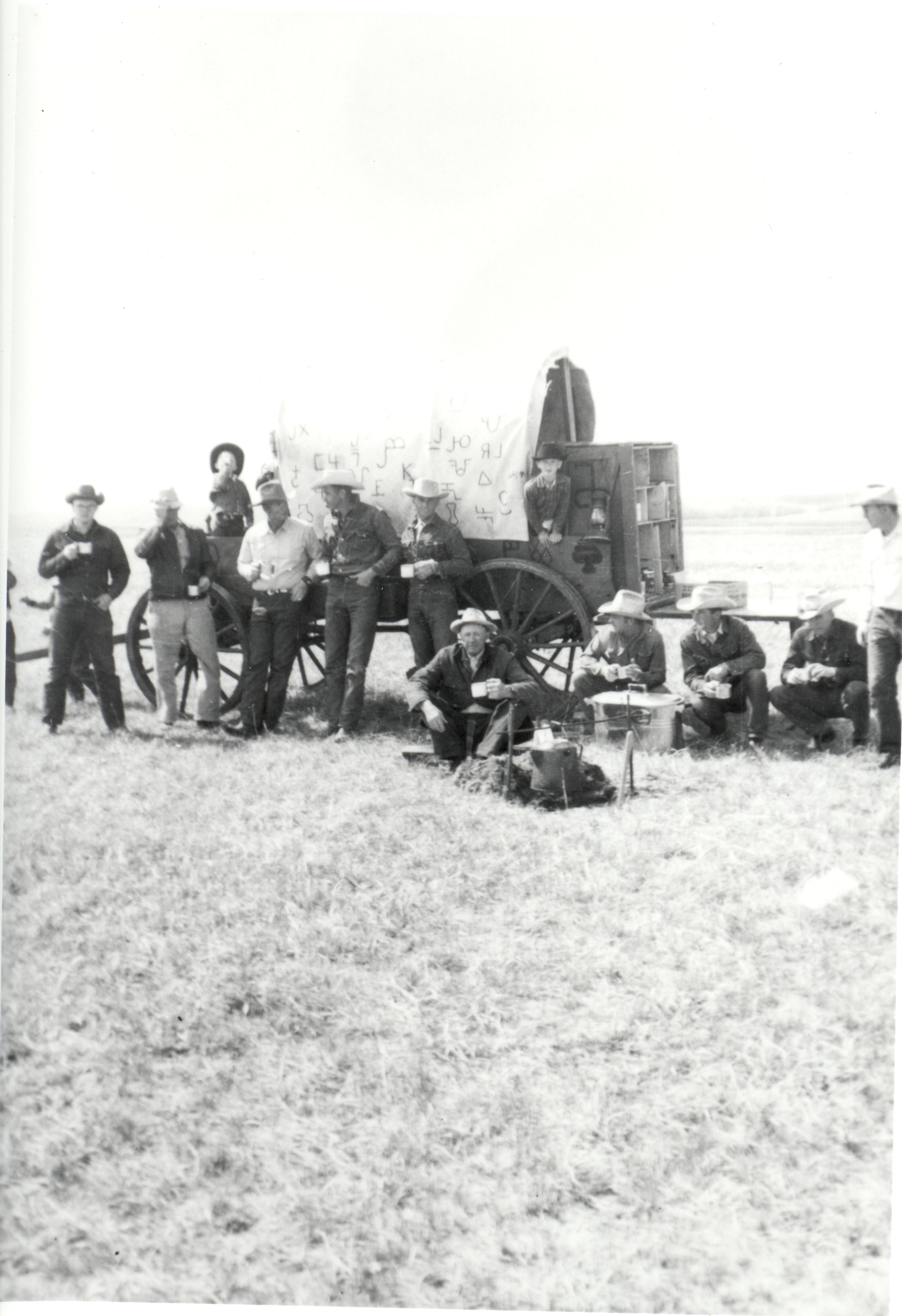
Spade Chuckwagon and part of crew (c. 1958)

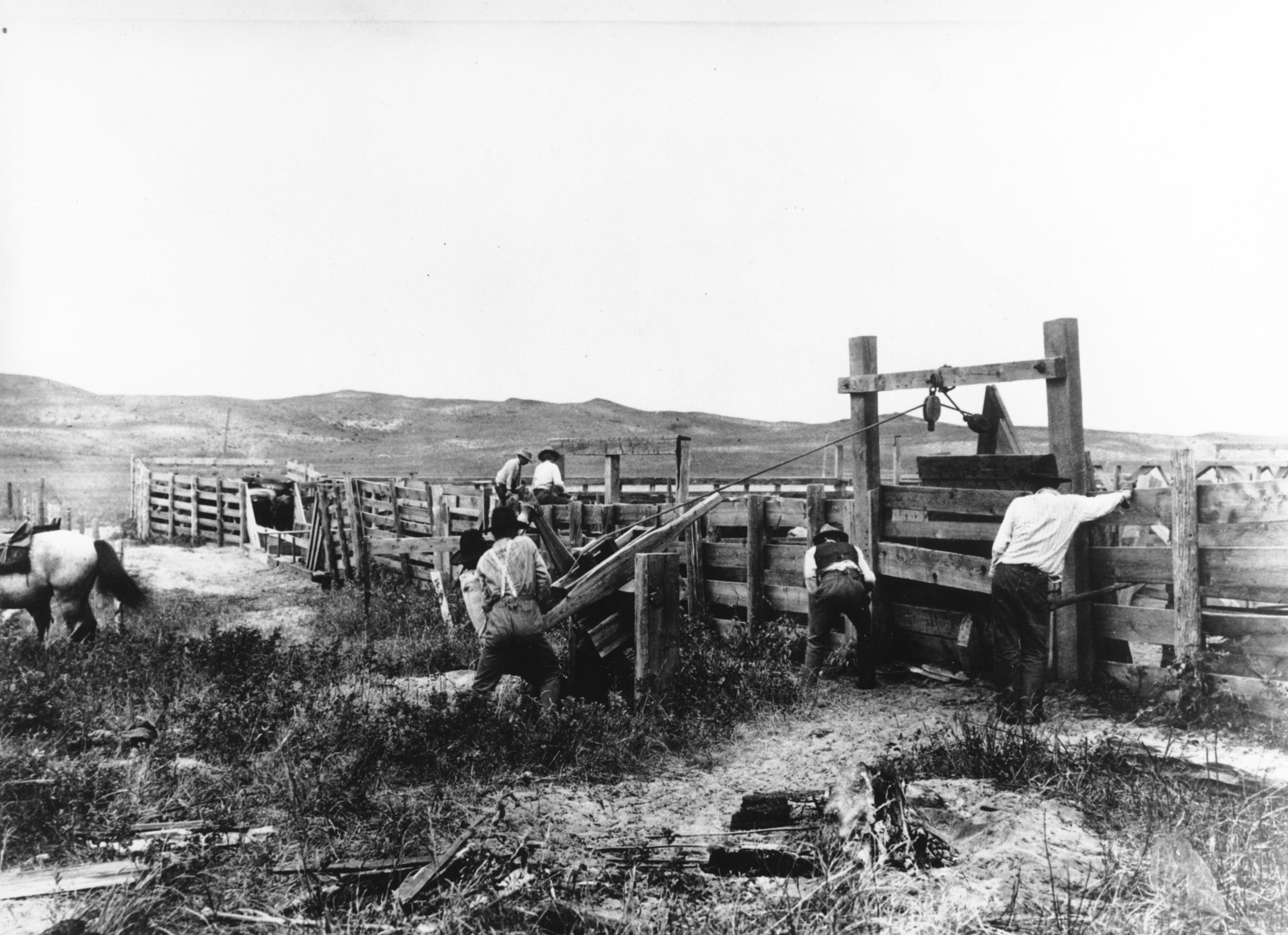
Dipping and Branding Cattle on Spade Ranch (c. 1900)

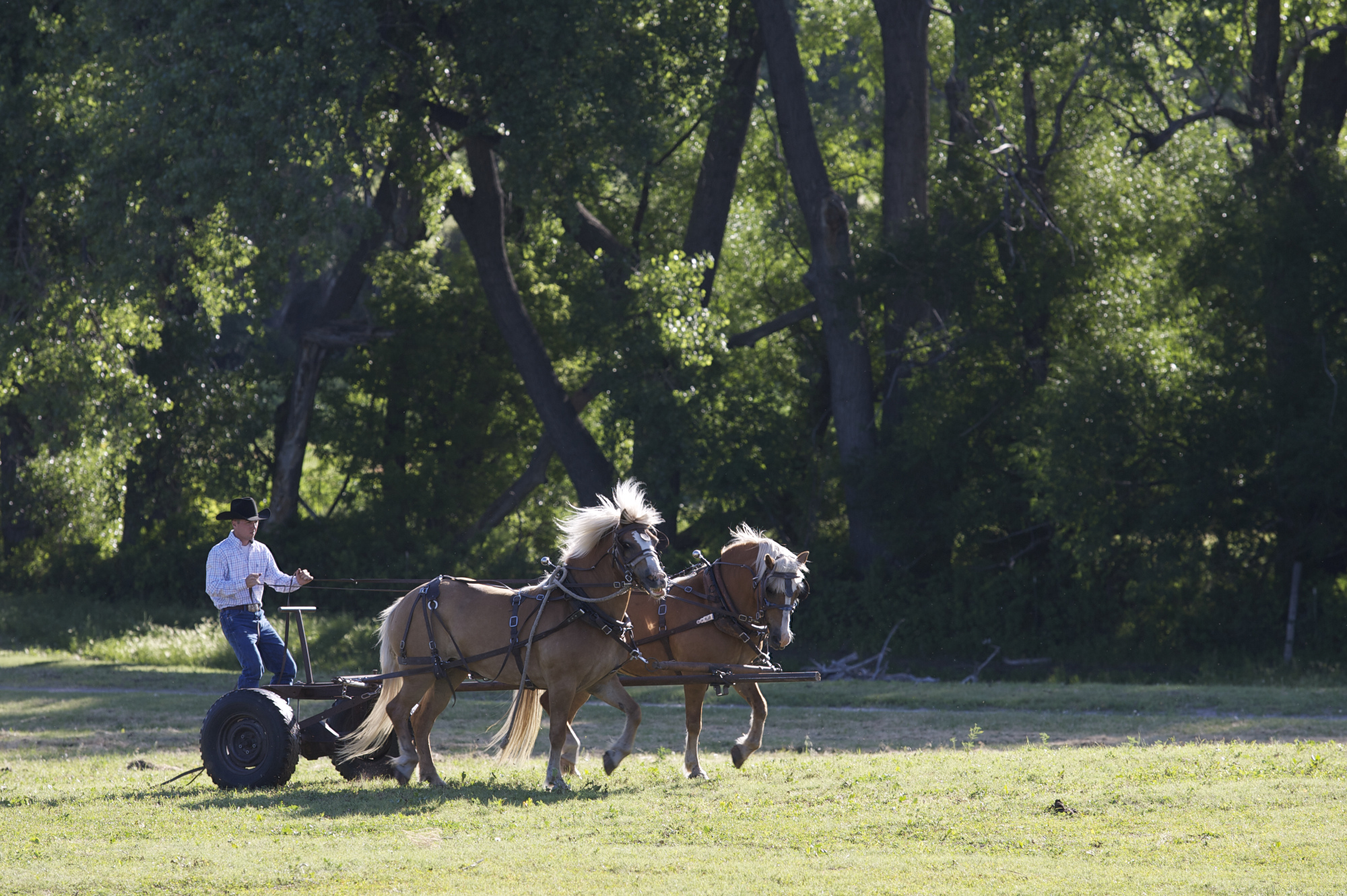
A team of Haflinger's driven by Clay Bixby at the Spade (c. 2009)

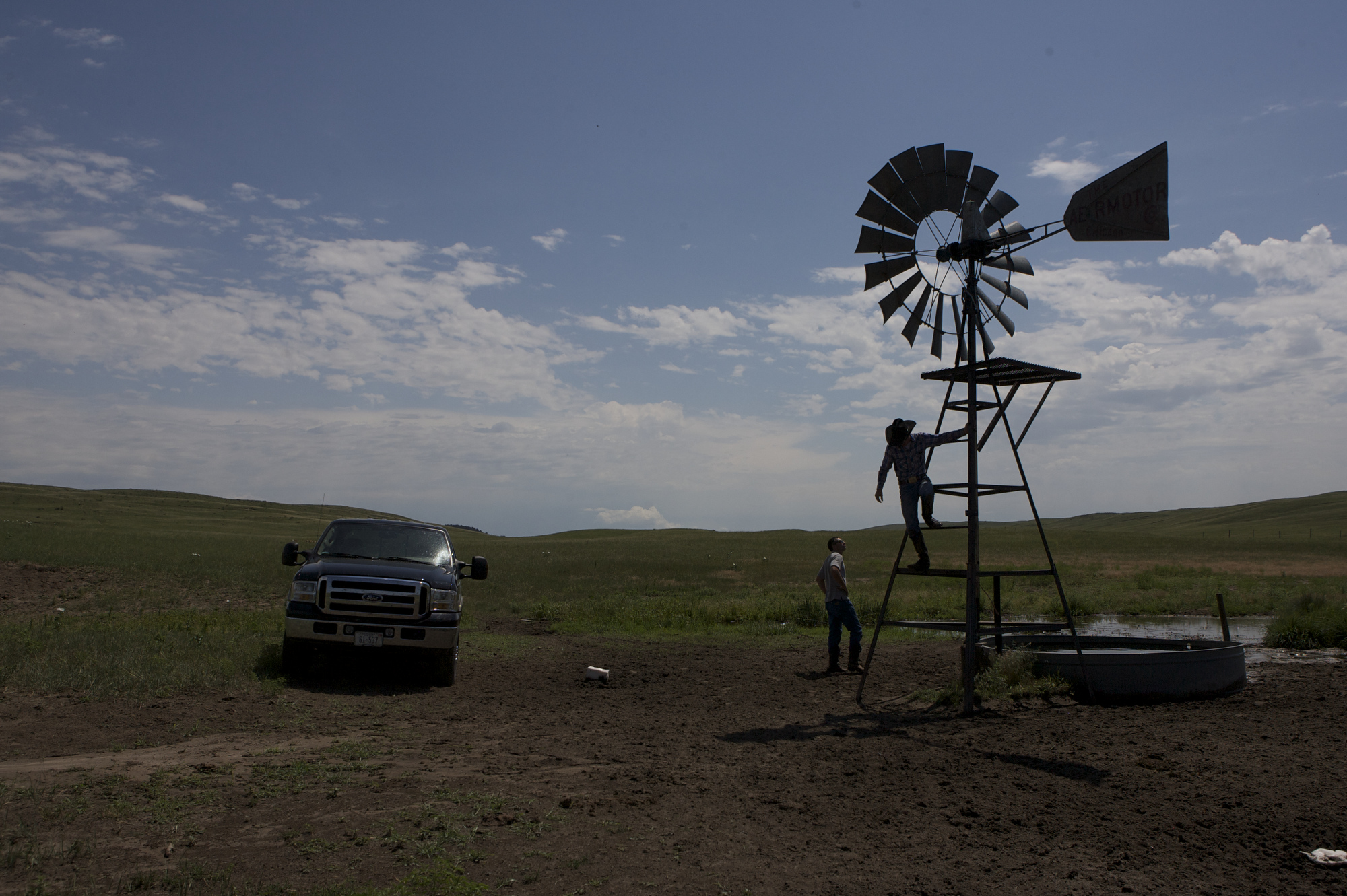
Checking a windmill on Spade Ranch summer range (c. 2009)

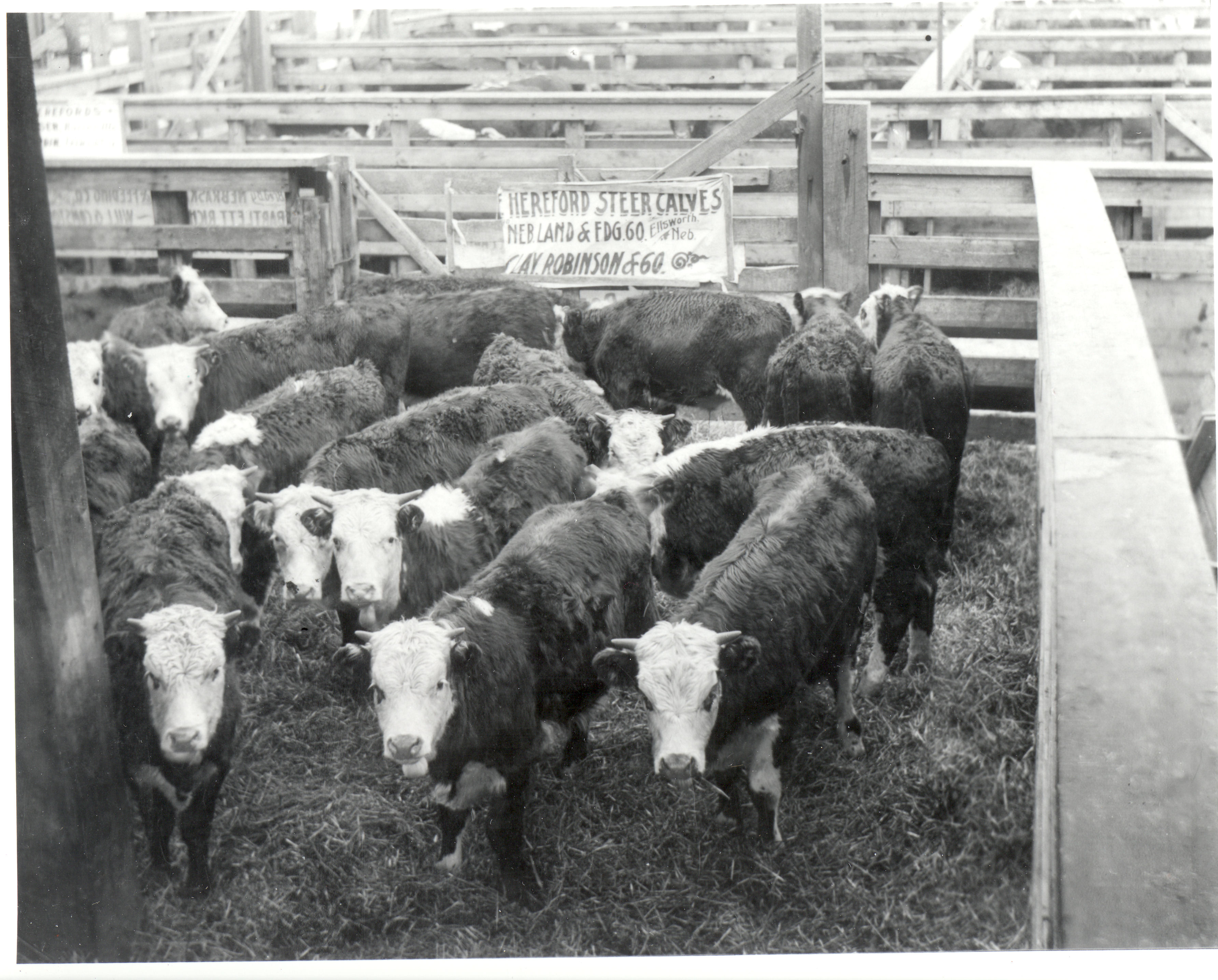
Spade steer calves at Kansas City Stockyards (c. 1903)

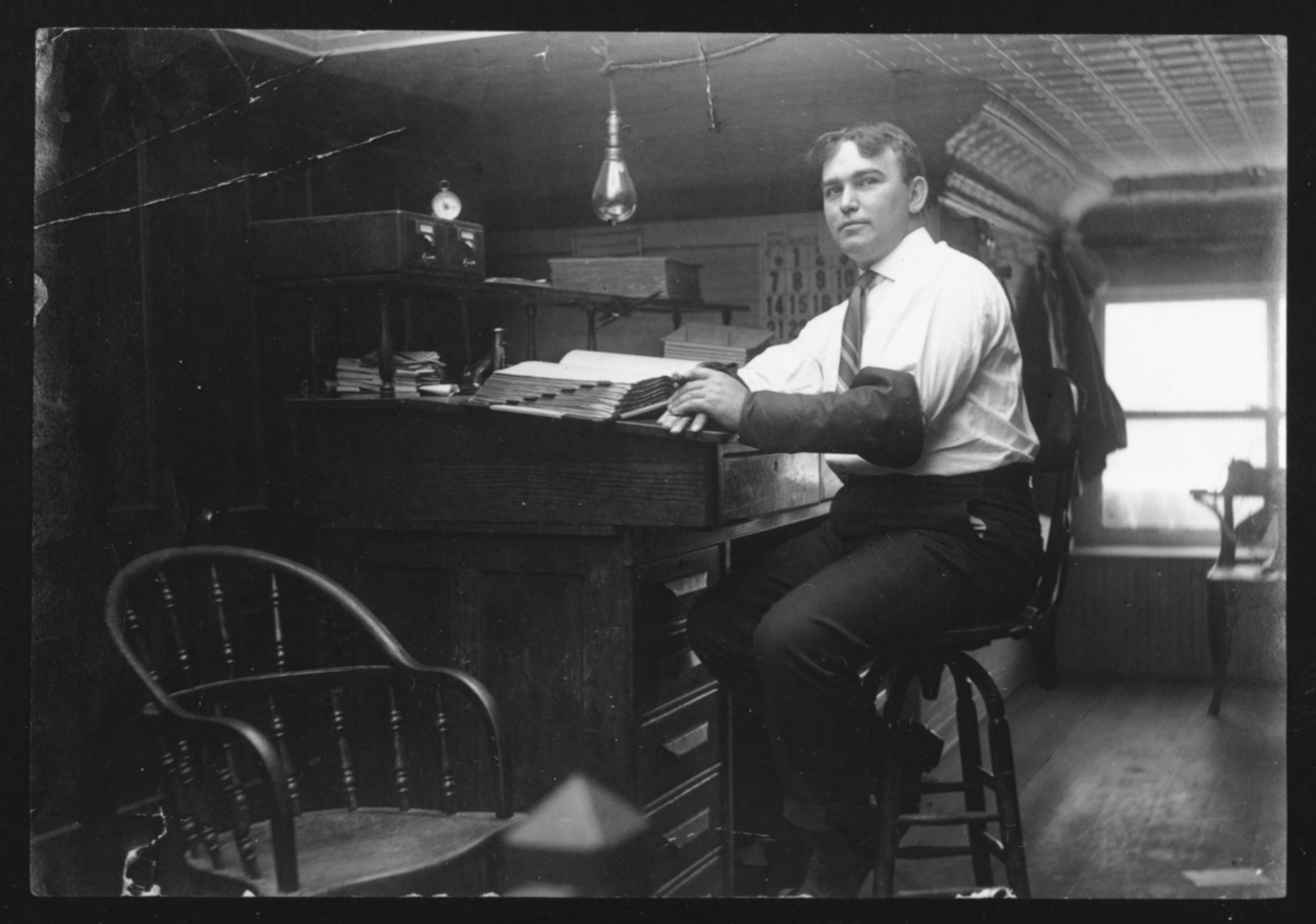
Ranch Secretary at Ellsworth Office (c. 1899)

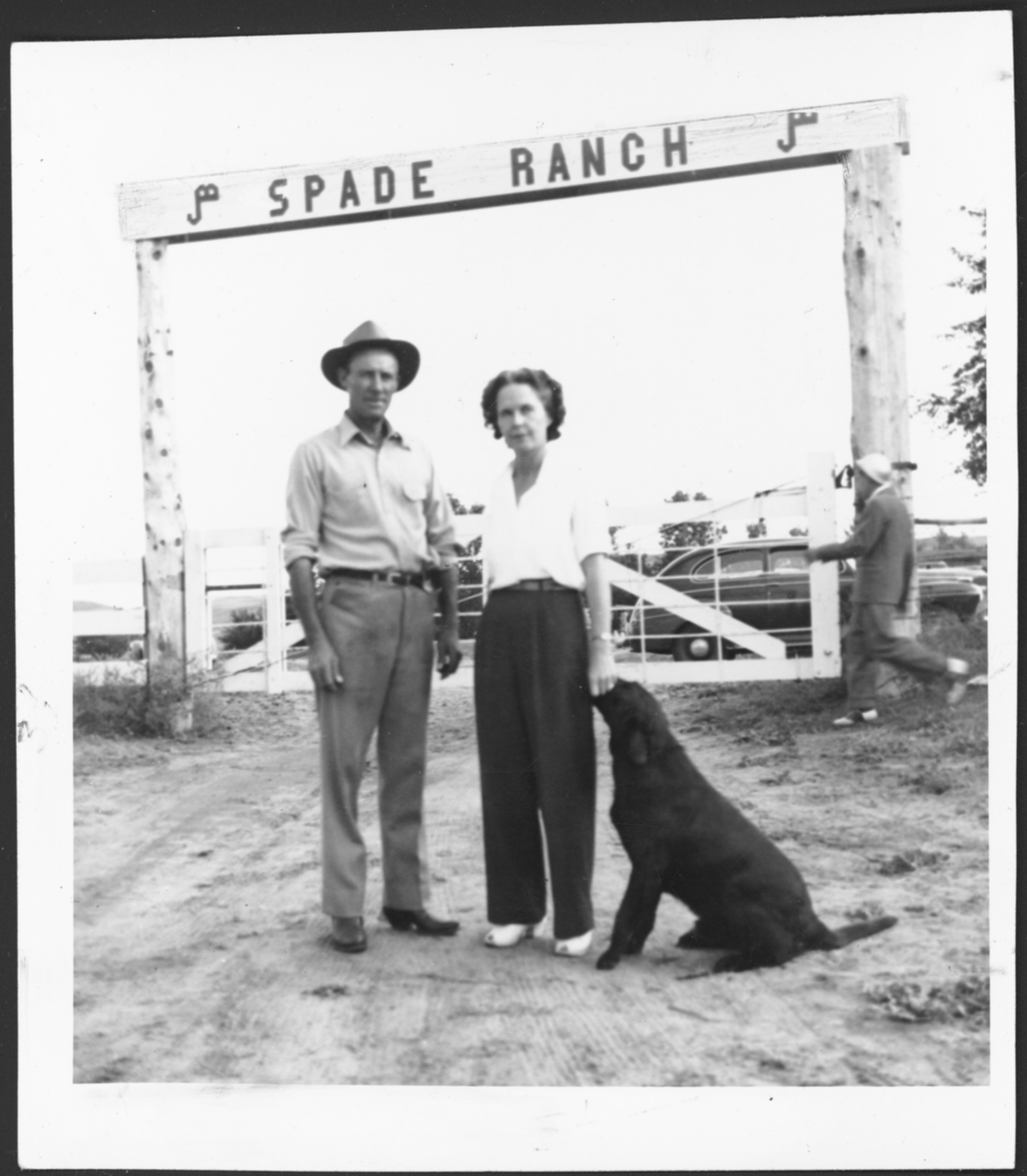
Lawrence Bixby and Wife Eleanor (ca.1955)

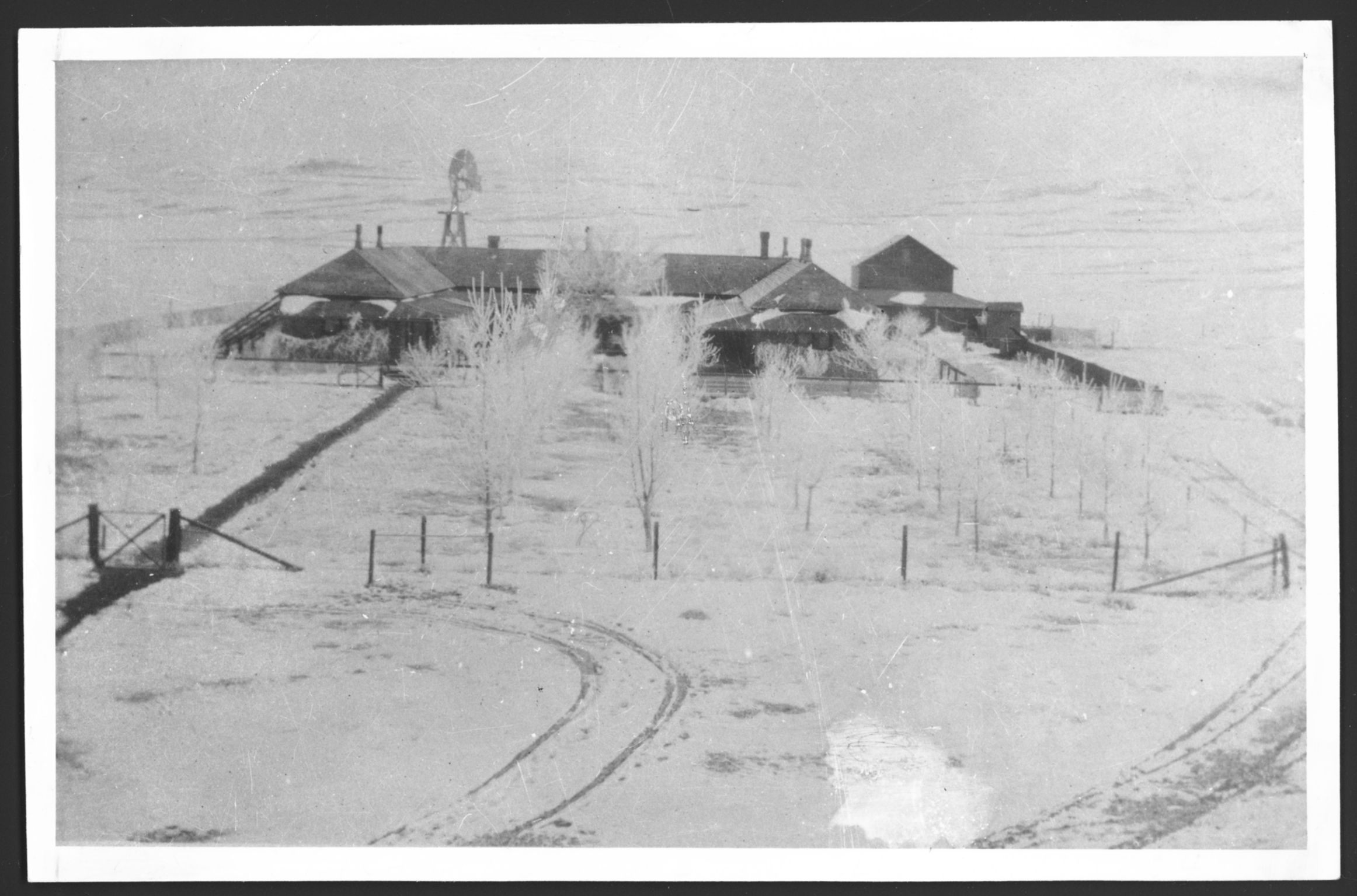
Richards summer home in Ellsworth (c. 1910)

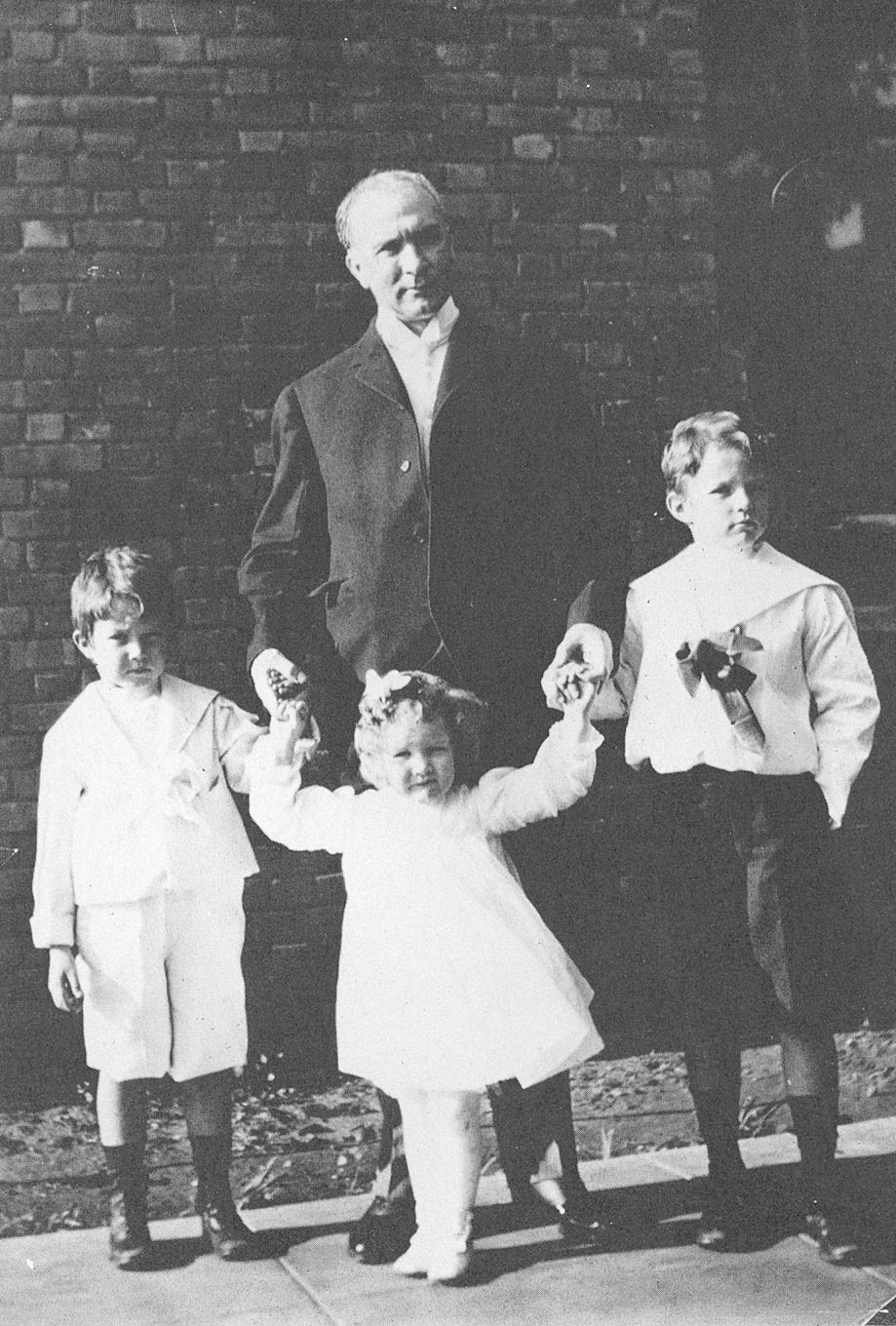
Bartlett Richards with children (c. 1908)

=== The Spade Ranch today ===
The Spade Ranch continues to operate today in the traditional western fashion. Most of the original buildings in the Home Valley of the Spade are extant and functioning in their original capacity. Although ranching operations have changed considerably since the early days of Richards and Comstock, cowboys and ranch hands are still employed by the Bixby's. The number of employees needed to operate the ranch has significantly decreased over the last few years due to advancements in technology and equipment. During the summer months of July and August hay is harvested out the large meadows to be used to feed cattle during winter. Calving season begins in February and tapers off by early April. This is a very critical time and the calving herd requires around the clock supervision. Large roundups are carried out in the spring and fall to ready cattle for market and branding. Branding at the Spade is a large yearly event – cattle are roped from horseback, wrestled by hand and branded with the Spade brand. The Branding is traditionally concluded with a large western dinner. Cattle are no longer shipped to market by train, but rather by cattle truck. Aircraft are used to locate cattle in large pastures, spot downed fences and for ranch business abroad. Bixby Black Angus cattle are nationally recognized for both their quality and genetics. The Bixby family works closely with the Nebraska State Historical Society and Chadron State College in the preservation and research of the Sandhills region of Nebraska.

Although some ranches around the Spade are no longer working cattle ranches, the Spade Ranch continues to operate as a beef cattle ranch. Richards and Comstock's legacy was carried on by Lawrence Bixby, whose legacy is carried on by his descendants. Historically, the Spade Ranch is an important feature of the landscape of Sheridan County, and it continues to be one today.

=== Books ===
Bartlett Richards: Nebraska Sandhills Cattleman written by son Bartlett Richards, Jr. with Ruth Van Ackeren, details the life of Bartlett Richards, Sr. with his personal and business correspondence from his first arriving at Cheyenne, Wyoming in August 1879, his education and apprenticeship with some of the most powerful Havard-taught cattle barons of the time, through the rise of his enormous cattle ranching empires in Wyoming and Nebraska, the controversial land trials at the hands of the government and to his unexpected death in 1911.

Lawrence Bixby: Preserver of the Old Spade Ranch written by Ruth Van Ackeren and Robert M. Howard, follows the story of Lawrence Bixby who raised Hereford cattle, Percheron and Belgian Workhorses and Calf Roping Quarterhorses.

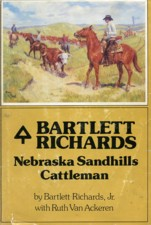

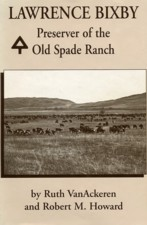

== See also ==
- Range war
- Rangeland
- Cowboy
- Animal husbandry
- List of Ranches and Stations

== Citations ==
- Beel, Marianne and Ruth Johnson Harms (1985). A Sandhill Century, Vol. Nos. 1 & 2. Valentine, Nebraska: Cherry County Centennial Committee. ISBN 0-9614508-2-7
- McIntosh, Charles (1996). The Nebraska Sandhills: The Human Landscape. Lincoln, Nebraska: University of Nebraska Press. ISBN 0-8032-3184-9.
- Richards, Jr., Bartlett and Ruth Van Ackeren (1980). Bartlett Richards: Nebraska Sandhills Cattleman. Lincoln, Nebraska: Nebraska State Historical Society. ISBN 0-686-31143-4.
- Van Ackeren, Ruth and Robert Howard (1995). Lawrence Bixby: Preserver Of The Old Spade Ranch. The Caxton Printers, Ltd.
- Yost, Nellie (1966). The Call Of The Range: The Story Of The Nebraska Stock Growers Association. Denver, Colorado: Sage Books.
